= List of top 10 singles in 2017 (Ireland) =

This is a list of singles that have peaked in the top 10 of the Irish Singles Chart during 2017, as compiled by the Official Charts Company on behalf of the Irish Recorded Music Association.

== Top-ten singles ==
Key

Symbol	Meaning
◁	Indicates single's top 10 entry was also its Irish Singles Chart top 100 debut

Artist(s)	Single	Peak	Peak date	Weeks at #1	Ref.
Neiked featuring Dyo	"Sexual"	2	6 January	-	
The Vamps featuring Matoma	"All Night"	6	6 January	-	
Zara Larsson	"I Would Like"	7	6 January	-	
Little Mix	"Touch"	5	13 January	-	
Starley	"Call on Me"	4	13 January	-	
Ed Sheeran	"Shape of You" ◁	1	13 January	14	
Ed Sheeran	"Castle on the Hill" ◁	2	13 January	-	
The Chainsmokers	"Paris" ◁	3	27 January	-	
Jax Jones featuring Raye	"You Don't Know Me"	3	3 February	-	
Zayn and Taylor Swift	"I Don't Wanna Live Forever"	4	17 February	-	
JP Cooper	"September Song"	7	17 February	-	
Rag'n'Bone Man	"Human"	8	17 February	-	
Ed Sheeran	"How Would You Feel (Paean)" ◁	5	24 February	-	
Katy Perry featuring Skip Marley	"Chained to the Rhythm" ◁	6	3 March	-	
Kygo and Selena Gomez	"It Ain't Me" ◁	2	3 March	-	
The Chainsmokers and Coldplay	"Something Just Like This" ◁	3	3 March	-	
Ed Sheeran	"Galway Girl" ◁	1	10 March	2	
Ed Sheeran	"Nancy Mulligan" ◁	3	10 March	-	
Ed Sheeran	"Happier" ◁	5	10 March	-	
Ed Sheeran	"What Do I Know?" ◁	8	10 March	-	
Ed Sheeran	"Supermarket Flowers" ◁	9	10 March	-	
Ed Sheeran	"Barcelona" ◁	10	10 March	-	
Ed Sheeran	"New Man" ◁	5	17 March	-	
Martin Jensen	"Solo Dance"	9	24 March	-	
Drake	"Passionfruit" ◁	4	31 March	-	
Harry Styles	"Sign of the Times" ◁	6	14 April	-	
Zedd and Alessia Cara	"Stay"	8	21 April	-	
Kendrick Lamar	"Humble"	4	21 April	-	
Clean Bandit featuring Zara Larsson	"Symphony"	2	28 April	-	
Luis Fonsi and Daddy Yankee featuring Justin Bieber	"Despacito"	1	5 May	15	
DJ Khaled featuring Justin Bieber, Quavo, Chance the Rapper and Lil Wayne	"I'm the One" ◁	2	12 May	-	
Shawn Mendes	"There's Nothing Holdin' Me Back"	3	26 May	-	
Jason Derulo featuring Nicki Minaj and Ty Dolla Sign	"Swalla"	9	26 May	-	
Miley Cyrus	"Malibu" ◁	7	26 May	-	
Niall Horan	"Slow Hands" ◁	3	16 June	-	
Liam Payne featuring Quavo	"Strip That Down"	2	16 June	-	
David Guetta featuring Justin Bieber	"2U" ◁	5	16 June	-	
Jonas Blue featuring William Singe	"Mama"	4	23 June	-	
French Montana featuring Swae Lee	"Unforgettable"	2	30 June	-	
DJ Khaled featuring Rihanna and Bryson Tiller	"Wild Thoughts"	3	30 June	-	
Maggie Lindemann	"Pretty Girl"	6	7 July	-	
Calvin Harris featuring Pharrell Williams, Katy Perry and Big Sean	"Feels"	3	14 July	-	
Sigala featuring Ella Eyre	"Came Here for Love"	9	11 August	-	
Rita Ora	"Your Song"	8	18 August	-	
Dua Lipa	"New Rules"	1	18 August	8	
Justin Bieber and BloodPop	"Friends" ◁	4	25 August	-	
Demi Lovato	"Sorry Not Sorry"	8	1 September	-	
Taylor Swift	"Look What You Made Me Do" ◁	1	1 September	1	
Axwell and Ingrosso	"More Than You Know"	10	1 September	-	
Sam Smith	"Too Good At Goodbyes" ◁	2	15 September	-	
Macklemore featuring Skylar Grey	"Glorious"	9	29 September	-	
J Balvin and Willy William featuring Beyoncé	"Mi Gente"	4	6 October	-	
Logic featuring Alessia Cara and Khalid	"1-800-273-8255"	9	6 October	-	
Zayn featuring Sia	"Dusk Till Dawn" ◁	4	13 October	-	
Pink	"What About Us"	5	20 October	-	
Post Malone featuring 21 Savage	"Rockstar" ◁	1	20 October	2	
Avicii featuring Rita Ora	"Lonely Together"	5	27 October	-	
Niall Horan	"Too Much to Ask"	6	27 October	-	
Camila Cabello featuring Young Thug	"Havana"	1	3 November	5	
Maroon 5 featuring SZA	"What Lovers Do"	7	3 November	-	
Eminem featuring Beyoncé	"Walk on Water" ◁	8	17 November	-	
Marshmello featuring Khalid	"Silence"	4	24 November	-	
Ed Sheeran	"Perfect" ◁	1	8 December	7	
NF	"Let You Down"	4	8 December	-	
Selena Gomez and Marshmello	"Wolves	5	8 December	-	
Eminem featuring Ed Sheeran	"River" ◁	2	22 December	-	

== See also ==
- 2017 in music
- List of number-one singles of 2017 (Ireland)
