= ÷ Tour =

2017–2019 concert tour by Ed Sheeran

- Tour by Ed Sheeran
- Promotional poster
- Location: Africa; Asia; Europe; North America; Oceania; South America
- Associated album: ÷
- Start date: 16 March 2017
- End date: 26 August 2019
- Legs: 14
- No. of shows: 260
- Attendance: 8.9 million
- Box office: $776.4 million (Note: $977.7 million in 2025 dollars.)

Ed Sheeran concert chronology
- x Tour (2014–2015); ÷ Tour (2017–2019); +−=÷× Tour (2022–2025)

The ÷ Tour (pronounced the "Divide Tour") was the third world concert tour by the English singer-songwriter Ed Sheeran, in support of his third studio album, ÷ (2017) (pronounced "divide"). Comprising 260 shows, it officially began on 16 March 2017, in Turin, Italy and ended on 26 August 2019, in Ipswich, England. Ticket sales started on 2 February 2017. The tour became the highest-grossing concert tour and the most tickets sold by a tour at the time.

== Development ==
On the morning of 26 January 2017, the European dates of the tour were announced through Sheeran's social networks. Hours later, through the same networks, the dates were announced for Latin America. Tickets for the tour sold out quickly, prompting new dates to be added in London, Turin and Santiago. On 13 February 2017 it was announced that he would be part of the line up for a week of gigs at the Royal Albert Hall in aid of the Teenage Cancer Trust taking place on 28 March 2017. On 22 February 2017, Sheeran announced that Anne-Marie and Ryan McMullan would be the opening acts for the European dates. On 8 March 2017, Sheeran announced the North American leg. James Blunt was announced as the opening act, except for Indianapolis and Cleveland, where the opener was Joshua Radin. On 10 May 2017, Sheeran announced the Oceanian leg. The tour was originally slated to have seven shows, but demand was high, the leg became eighteen shows. On 8 June 2017, Sheeran announced the Asian leg of the tour, which was originally planned for October 2017 until November 2017. However, due to bone fractures in his arms from a bike accident, he had to postpone and cancel parts of the Asian leg. Rescheduled shows in Manila, Osaka, and Tokyo occurred in April 2018, but Taipei, Seoul, Hong Kong, and Jakarta were cancelled.

Lauv served as the opening act in Asia in November. On 28 June 2017, Sheeran announced a stadium tour across Europe. After the initial announcement, tickets sold quickly, which prompted new dates in Cork, Dublin, Manchester, Glasgow, Newcastle, London, Cardiff, Amsterdam, Paris, Gothenburg, Munich, Zürich, Vienna, and Warsaw. Anne-Marie returned as the opening act, while Jamie Lawson was added, and Beoga was added for Ireland. On 22 September 2017, Sheeran announced a stadium tour across North America. On 6 February 2018, Sheeran added dates to the leg with new cities that were not in the initial announcement, and second shows in Toronto, Foxborough, and East Rutherford. Snow Patrol was announced as the main opener for the North American stadium leg, along with Anne-Marie and Lauv in selected dates. On 25 June 2018, Sheeran added two dates, performing in South Africa in March 2019.

On 19 September 2018, Sheeran added more 2019 dates to the tour, performing in stadiums across Europe and the UK, starting in May 2019. Due to high demand, numerous additional dates were added to the tour itinerary.

Sheeran later added even more 2019 dates to the Divide tour, performing in Brazil, Uruguay, and Argentina in February 2019. He also announced that he would be returning to Asia in April 2019, performing the long-awaited dates that were scheduled to take place in Fall 2017 but were cancelled and rescheduled due to bone fractures in the arms from a bike accident. The cities that were affected by the cancellation were Taipei, Seoul, Hong Kong and Jakarta. Sheeran will perform three Asia 2019 dates in Singapore, Seoul, and Bangkok. Sheeran later announced a second date in Cape Town, South Africa at Cape Town Stadium, scheduled for 28 March 2019. On 28 November, Sheeran added dates in Tokyo, Osaka, and Jakarta. On 10 January 2019, Sheeran added dates in Taiwan, Hong Kong and Kuala Lumpur.

For the last four shows, Sheeran played at Chantry Park in Ipswich in what was advertised as a homecoming set of gigs. For each of the four nights, a different additional support act performed; three were chosen by BBC Music Introducing in Suffolk and one by Hoax, all of which were local undercover artists. The local acts that performed were Bessie Turner, Caswell, Salvador and Piers James.

== Commercial performance ==
In Ireland, more than 300,000 tickets for seven shows across Cork, Belfast, Galway and Dublin were sold in a single day, making history with Sheeran being the only artist to ever do so in Irish territory. Due to the phenomenal demand, extra dates were added in both Cork and Dublin, with three dates for each city in total. Sellout status occurred once again in Santiago during his first concert on 15 May, prompting to add one more date.

In Oceania, the tour broke the official record for the most tickets sold, at over 1 million (previously held by the Dire Straits Brothers in Arms Tour of 1985, with around 950,000), as well as most stadium shows by a single artist on one tour (18, formerly held by AC/DC at 14). Sheeran also broke records for the biggest stadium tour of Australia and New Zealand, venue record for highest cumulative attendance on one tour and venue record for highest attendance for a single show. More than 710,000 tickets were sold within a single day of general public sale. In Sydney, a total of 243,513 tickets were sold for three shows at the ANZ Stadium, which rolled out over three successive nights from 15 to 17 March 2018. The attendance per show was 79,726, 81,752 and 82,035, respectively. This set a new record for aggregate attendance at a series of stadium concerts in NSW, smashing the old benchmark of 213,045 set by AC/DC on their Black Ice World Tour in 2010.

According to Billboard, Sheeran's tour grossed $776.4 million from 8.9 million tickets sold. The tour was the eighth highest-grossing tour of 2017, accumulating $122 million and selling 1,408,681 tickets. The Divide Tour became 2018's highest-grossing tour with $429 million, setting all-time records for the highest-grossing solo tour and highest year-end gross ever. It then broke the all-time highest-grossing record of $735 million for any tour set by the U2 360° Tour before it finished, despite playing mostly in smaller venues and deliberately keeping tickets price relatively low with no VIP areas. This is due to the larger number of shows (255) in the tour, and it also became the most attended tour of all time with over 8.5 million having attended in 43 countries with further dates to play.

== Set list ==
This set list is from the concert on 5 August 2017 in Glendale. It is not intended to represent all shows from the tour.

1. "Castle on the Hill"
2. "Eraser"
3. "The A Team"
4. "Don't" / "New Man"
5. "Dive"
6. "Bloodstream"
7. "Happier"
8. "Galway Girl"
9. "I See Fire"
10. "How Would You Feel (Paean)"
11. "Photograph"
12. "Perfect"
13. "Nancy Mulligan"
14. "Thinking Out Loud"
15. "Sing"
16. Encore
17. "Shape of You"
18. "You Need Me, I Don't Need You"

== Tour dates ==
List of 2017 concerts
Dates (2017)	City	Country	Venue	Opening act(s)	Tickets Sold/Available	Revenue
16 March	Turin	Italy	Pala Alpitour	Anne-Marie; Ryan McMullan	23,256 / 23,256	$1,219,480
17 March	Turin	Italy	Pala Alpitour	Anne-Marie; Ryan McMullan	23,256 / 23,256	$1,219,480
19 March	Zurich	Switzerland	Hallenstadion	Anne-Marie; Ryan McMullan	14,444 / 14,444	$1,148,585
20 March	Munich	Germany	Olympiahalle	Anne-Marie; Ryan McMullan	12,076 / 12,108	$919,768
22 March	Mannheim	Germany	SAP Arena	Anne-Marie; Ryan McMullan	10,843 / 10,848	$740,662
23 March	Cologne	Germany	Lanxess Arena	Anne-Marie; Ryan McMullan	16,223 / 16,319	$1,116,989
26 March	Hamburg	Germany	Barclaycard Arena	Anne-Marie; Ryan McMullan	12,256 / 13,227	$822,229
27 March	Berlin	Germany	Mercedes-Benz Arena	Anne-Marie; Ryan McMullan	14,104 / 14,104	$990,085
28 March (Note: The show on 28 March 2017, at the Royal Albert Hall, London, was a part of the Teenage Cancer Trust fundraising week.)	London	England	Royal Albert Hall	Busted	5,167 / 5,167	$379,534
30 March	Stockholm	Sweden	Ericsson Globe	Anne-Marie; Ryan McMullan	14,024 / 14,260	$1,003,630
1 April	Herning	Denmark	Jyske Bank Boxen	Anne-Marie; Ryan McMullan	14,996 / 14,996	$1,268,365
3 April	Amsterdam	Netherlands	Ziggo Dome	Anne-Marie; Ryan McMullan	33,255 / 33,255	$2,122,188
4 April	Amsterdam	Netherlands	Ziggo Dome	Anne-Marie; Ryan McMullan	33,255 / 33,255	$2,122,188
5 April	Antwerp	Belgium	Sportpaleis	Anne-Marie; Ryan McMullan	21,151 / 21,151	$1,327,990
6 April	Paris	France	AccorHotels Arena	Anne-Marie; Ryan McMullan	15,988 / 15,988	$802,830
8 April	Madrid	Spain	Wizink Center	Anne-Marie; Ryan McMullan	15,748 / 16,000	$1,009,283
9 April	Barcelona	Spain	Palau Sant Jordi	Anne-Marie; Ryan McMullan	17,476 / 17,476	$963,754
12 April	Dublin	Ireland	3Arena	Anne-Marie; Ryan McMullan	25,478 / 25,538	$1,200,840
13 April	Dublin	Ireland	3Arena	Anne-Marie; Ryan McMullan	25,478 / 25,538	$1,200,840
16 April	Glasgow	Scotland	SSE Hydro	Anne-Marie; Ryan McMullan	25,220 / 25,228	$1,991,969
17 April	Glasgow	Scotland	SSE Hydro	Anne-Marie; Ryan McMullan	25,220 / 25,228	$1,991,969
19 April	Newcastle	England	Metro Radio Arena	Anne-Marie; Ryan McMullan	21,558 / 22,286	$1,636,406
20 April	Newcastle	England	Metro Radio Arena	Anne-Marie; Ryan McMullan	21,558 / 22,286	$1,636,406
22 April	Manchester	England	Manchester Arena	Anne-Marie; Ryan McMullan	31,333 / 31,378	$2,567,282
23 April	Manchester	England	Manchester Arena	Anne-Marie; Ryan McMullan	31,333 / 31,378	$2,567,282
25 April	Nottingham	England	Motorpoint Arena	Anne-Marie; Ryan McMullan	18,790 / 18,800	$1,568,523
26 April	Nottingham	England	Motorpoint Arena	Anne-Marie; Ryan McMullan	18,790 / 18,800	$1,568,523
28 April	Birmingham	England	Barclaycard Arena	Anne-Marie; Ryan McMullan	30,994 / 31,262	$2,550,013
29 April	Birmingham	England	Barclaycard Arena	Anne-Marie; Ryan McMullan	30,994 / 31,262	$2,550,013
1 May	London	England	The O_{2} Arena	Anne-Marie; Ryan McMullan	55,707 / 56,400	$6,992,411
2 May	London	England	The O_{2} Arena	Anne-Marie; Ryan McMullan	55,707 / 56,400	$6,992,411
3 May	London	England	The O_{2} Arena	Anne-Marie; Ryan McMullan	55,707 / 56,400	$6,992,411
13 May	Lima	Peru	National Stadium of Peru	Antonio Lulic	19,745 / 19,745	$1,297,277
15 May	Santiago	Chile	Movistar Arena	Intimate Stranger; Antonio Lulic	26,984 / 26,984	$2,106,079
16 May	Santiago	Chile	Movistar Arena	Intimate Stranger; Antonio Lulic	26,984 / 26,984	$2,106,079
20 May	La Plata	Argentina	Estadio Ciudad de La Plata	Benjamin Amadeo; Antonio Lulic	33,584 / 33,584	$2,394,891
23 May	Curitiba	Brazil	Pedreira Paulo Leminski	Antonio Lulic	17,400 / 17,400	$1,407,552
25 May	Rio de Janeiro	Brazil	Jeunesse Arena	Antonio Lulic	12,087 / 12,087	$1,024,384
28 May	São Paulo	Brazil	Allianz Parque	Antonio Lulic	37,075 / 37,075	$3,468,481
30 May	Belo Horizonte	Brazil	Esplanada do Minerão	Antonio Lulic	14,143 / 14,143	$1,067,819
2 June	Bogotá	Colombia	Simón Bolívar Park	Sebastián Yatra; Antonio Lulic	15,588 / 15,588	$1,166,489
4 June	San Juan	Puerto Rico	Coliseo de Puerto Rico	Yebba	14,297 / 14,297	$1,017,458
6 June	Alajuela	Costa Rica	Coca-Cola Amphitheater	Antonio Lulic	17,464 / 17,464	$1,254,439
10 June	Mexico City	Mexico	Palacio de los Deportes	Antonio Lulic	21,363 / 21,500	$1,297,061
12 June	Guadalajara	Mexico	Arena VFG	Antonio Lulic	11,780 / 12,000	$939,881
14 June	Monterrey	Mexico	Auditorio Citibanamex	Antonio Lulic	7,865 / 7,865	$884,621
22 June (Note: The show on 22 June 2017, in London at The O_{2} Arena was part of the venue's 10th anniversary celebration.)	London	England	The O_{2} Arena	Fuse ODG	18,699 / 18,841	$1,705,113
25 June (Note: The show on 25 June 2017, at Worthy Farm, Pilton, was part of the Glastonbury Festival.)	Pilton	England	Worthy Farm	—N/a	—N/a	—N/a
29 June	Kansas City	United States	Sprint Center	James Blunt	13,382 / 13,382	$1,217,313
30 June	Des Moines	United States	Wells Fargo Arena	James Blunt	13,375 / 13,375	$1,078,939
1 July	Saint Paul	United States	Xcel Energy Center	James Blunt	14,938 / 14,938	$1,375,063
7 July	Toronto	Canada	Air Canada Centre	James Blunt	30,516 / 30,516	$2,548,961
8 July	Toronto	Canada	Air Canada Centre	James Blunt	30,516 / 30,516	$2,548,961
9 July	Buffalo	United States	KeyBank Center	James Blunt	14,305 / 14,305	$1,167,095
11 July	Philadelphia	United States	Wells Fargo Center	James Blunt	28,922 / 28,922	$2,630,260
12 July	Philadelphia	United States	Wells Fargo Center	James Blunt	28,922 / 28,922	$2,630,260
14 July	Uncasville	United States	Mohegan Sun Arena	James Blunt	14,887 / 14,887	$1,079,165
15 July	Uncasville	United States	Mohegan Sun Arena	James Blunt	14,887 / 14,887	$1,079,165
18 July	Quebec City	Canada	Videotron Centre	James Blunt	13,611 / 13,611	$1,134,346
19 July	Montreal	Canada	Bell Centre	James Blunt	15,264 / 15,264	$1,247,546
22 July	Winnipeg	Canada	Bell MTS Place	James Blunt	11,843 / 11,843	$977,093
23 July	Saskatoon	Canada	SaskTel Centre	James Blunt	12,585 / 12,585	$1,023,210
25 July	Edmonton	Canada	Rogers Place	James Blunt	27,412 / 27,412	$2,260,486
26 July	Edmonton	Canada	Rogers Place	James Blunt	27,412 / 27,412	$2,260,486
28 July	Vancouver	Canada	Rogers Arena	James Blunt	14,070 / 14,070	$1,165,985
29 July	Tacoma	United States	Tacoma Dome	James Blunt	19,538 / 19,538	$1,575,039
30 July	Portland	United States	Moda Center	James Blunt	13,420 / 13,420	$1,074,959
1 August	Sacramento	United States	Golden 1 Center	James Blunt	13,424 / 13,424	$1,220,937
2 August	Oakland	United States	Oracle Arena	James Blunt	13,662 / 13,662	$1,219,722
4 August	Las Vegas	United States	T-Mobile Arena	James Blunt	15,243 / 15,243	$1,326,231
5 August	Glendale	United States	Gila River Arena	James Blunt	13,654 / 13,654	$1,239,478
6 August	San Diego	United States	Valley View Casino Center	James Blunt	10,233 / 10,233	$917,154
10 August	Los Angeles	United States	Staples Center	James Blunt	40,731 / 40,731	$3,622,204
11 August	Los Angeles	United States	Staples Center	James Blunt	40,731 / 40,731	$3,622,204
12 August	Los Angeles	United States	Staples Center	James Blunt	40,731 / 40,731	$3,622,204
15 August	Denver	United States	Pepsi Center	James Blunt	12,917 / 12,917	$1,159,523
17 August	Tulsa	United States	BOK Center	James Blunt	12,069 / 12,069	$961,178
18 August	Dallas	United States	American Airlines Center	James Blunt	13,632 / 13,632	$1,207,645
19 August	Houston	United States	Toyota Center	James Blunt	11,811 / 11,811	$1,067,592
22 August	San Antonio	United States	AT&T Center	James Blunt	13,928 / 13,928	$1,112,573
25 August	Duluth	United States	Infinite Energy Arena	James Blunt	21,056 / 21,056	$1,970,117
26 August	Duluth	United States	Infinite Energy Arena	James Blunt	21,056 / 21,056	$1,970,117
29 August	Tampa	United States	Amalie Arena	James Blunt	13,459 / 13,459	$1,076,537
30 August	Miami	United States	American Airlines Arena	James Blunt	12,813 / 12,813	$1,144,534
31 August	Orlando	United States	Amway Center	James Blunt	12,360 / 12,360	$1,007,408
2 September	Raleigh	United States	PNC Arena	James Blunt	13,805 / 13,805	$1,134,012
3 September	Charlotte	United States	Spectrum Center	James Blunt	13,927 / 13,927	$1,243,772
5 September	North Charleston	United States	North Charleston Coliseum	James Blunt	8,271 / 8,517	$673,758
7 September	Louisville	United States	KFC Yum! Center	James Blunt	15,721 / 15,721	$1,257,529
8 September	Indianapolis	United States	Bankers Life Fieldhouse	Joshua Radin	12,740 / 12,740	$1,014,966
9 September	Cleveland	United States	Quicken Loans Arena	Joshua Radin	14,912 / 14,912	$1,365,524
12 September	Omaha	United States	CenturyLink Center Omaha	James Blunt	13,990 / 13,990	$1,098,225
15 September	Rosemont	United States	Allstate Arena	James Blunt	26,346 / 26,346	$2,347,880
16 September	Rosemont	United States	Allstate Arena	James Blunt	26,346 / 26,346	$2,347,880
19 September	Washington, D.C.	United States	Capital One Arena	James Blunt	27,497 / 27,497	$2,456,333
20 September	Washington, D.C.	United States	Capital One Arena	James Blunt	27,497 / 27,497	$2,456,333
22 September	Boston	United States	TD Garden	James Blunt	25,590 / 25,590	$2,295,216
23 September	Boston	United States	TD Garden	James Blunt	25,590 / 25,590	$2,295,216
26 September	Pittsburgh	United States	PPG Paints Arena	James Blunt	13,331 / 13,331	$1,190,945
27 September	Detroit	United States	Little Caesars Arena	James Blunt	14,124 / 14,124	$1,268,652
29 September	Brooklyn	United States	Barclays Center	James Blunt	41,066 / 41,066	$3,658,480
30 September	Brooklyn	United States	Barclays Center	James Blunt	41,066 / 41,066	$3,658,480
1 October	Brooklyn	United States	Barclays Center	James Blunt	41,066 / 41,066	$3,658,480
3 October	Columbus	United States	Nationwide Arena	James Blunt	27,255 / 27,255	$2,199,218
4 October	Columbus	United States	Nationwide Arena	James Blunt	27,255 / 27,255	$2,199,218
6 October	Nashville	United States	Bridgestone Arena	James Blunt	27,721 / 27,721	$2,503,808
7 October	Nashville	United States	Bridgestone Arena	James Blunt	27,721 / 27,721	$2,503,808
11 November	Singapore		Singapore Indoor Stadium	Lauv	18,297 / 18,297	$2,584,230
12 November	Singapore		Singapore Indoor Stadium	Lauv	18,297 / 18,297	$2,584,230
14 November	Kuala Lumpur	Malaysia	Axiata Arena	Lauv	11,597 / 11,597	$980,033
16 November	Bangkok	Thailand	Impact Arena	Lauv	14,394 / 14,394	$1,744,270
19 November	Mumbai	India	JioGarden	Lauv	11,103 / 11,103	$1,101,118
23 November	Dubai	United Arab Emirates	Autism Rocks Arena	Lauv	23,272 / 23,272	$2,783,800

List of 2018 concerts
Dates (2018)	City	Country	Venue	Opening act(s)	Attendance	Revenue
19 February (Note: The show on 19 February 2018, in London at indigo at The 0_{2} is part of the BRITs Week War Child 2018.)	London	England	Indigo at The O_{2}	—N/a	2,056 / 2,717	$224,718
2 March	Perth	Australia	Optus Stadium	Missy Higgins; Fergus James	114,031 / 114,031	$9,146,953
3 March	Perth	Australia	Optus Stadium	Missy Higgins; Fergus James	114,031 / 114,031	$9,146,953
7 March	Adelaide	Australia	Adelaide Oval	Missy Higgins; Fergus James	62,915 / 62,915	$5,103,599
9 March	Melbourne	Australia	Etihad Stadium	Missy Higgins; Bliss n Eso	256,622 / 256,622	$20,838,652
10 March	Melbourne	Australia	Etihad Stadium	Missy Higgins; Bliss n Eso	256,622 / 256,622	$20,838,652
11 March	Melbourne	Australia	Etihad Stadium	Missy Higgins; Bliss n Eso	256,622 / 256,622	$20,838,652
12 March	Melbourne	Australia	Etihad Stadium	Missy Higgins; Bliss n Eso	256,622 / 256,622	$20,838,652
15 March	Sydney	Australia	ANZ Stadium	Missy Higgins; Ryan McMullan	231,185 / 231,185	$19,948,066
16 March	Sydney	Australia	ANZ Stadium	Missy Higgins; Ryan McMullan	231,185 / 231,185	$19,948,066
17 March	Sydney	Australia	ANZ Stadium	Missy Higgins; Ryan McMullan	231,185 / 231,185	$19,948,066
20 March	Brisbane	Australia	Suncorp Stadium	Missy Higgins; Fergus James	103,744 / 103,744	$8,595,585
21 March	Brisbane	Australia	Suncorp Stadium	Missy Higgins; Fergus James	103,744 / 103,744	$8,595,585
24 March	Auckland	New Zealand	Mount Smart Stadium	Drax Project	132,876 / 132,876	$10,766,558
25 March	Auckland	New Zealand	Mount Smart Stadium	Drax Project	132,876 / 132,876	$10,766,558
26 March	Auckland	New Zealand	Mount Smart Stadium	Drax Project	132,876 / 132,876	$10,766,558
29 March	Dunedin	New Zealand	Forsyth Barr Stadium	Six60; Mitch James	105,014 / 105,014	$8,475,218
31 March	Dunedin	New Zealand	Forsyth Barr Stadium	Six60; Mitch James	105,014 / 105,014	$8,475,218
1 April	Dunedin	New Zealand	Forsyth Barr Stadium	Six60; Mitch James	105,014 / 105,014	$8,475,218
8 April	Manila	Philippines	Mall of Asia Concert Grounds	—N/a	18,752 / 18,752	$2,412,506
11 April	Osaka	Japan	Osaka-Jo Hall	—N/a	10,161 / 10,161	$1,284,070
13 April	Tokyo	Japan	Budokan Hall	—N/a	19,549 / 19,549	$2,504,547
14 April	Tokyo	Japan	Budokan Hall	—N/a	19,549 / 19,549	$2,504,547
4 May	Cork	Ireland	Páirc Uí Chaoimh	Anne-Marie; Jamie Lawson; Beoga	128,969 / 128,969	$12,371,587
5 May	Cork	Ireland	Páirc Uí Chaoimh	Anne-Marie; Jamie Lawson; Beoga	128,969 / 128,969	$12,371,587
6 May	Cork	Ireland	Páirc Uí Chaoimh	Anne-Marie; Jamie Lawson; Beoga	128,969 / 128,969	$12,371,587
9 May	Belfast	Northern Ireland	Boucher Playing Fields	Anne-Marie; Jamie Lawson; Beoga	40,613 / 40,613	$3,911,083
12 May	Galway	Ireland	Pearse Stadium	Anne-Marie; Jamie Lawson; Beoga	63,991 / 63,991	$5,952,120
13 May	Galway	Ireland	Pearse Stadium	Anne-Marie; Jamie Lawson; Beoga	63,991 / 63,991	$5,952,120
16 May	Dublin	Ireland	Phoenix Park	Anne-Marie; Jamie Lawson; Beoga	184,187 / 184,187	$17,090,104
18 May	Dublin	Ireland	Phoenix Park	Anne-Marie; Jamie Lawson; Beoga	184,187 / 184,187	$17,090,104
19 May	Dublin	Ireland	Phoenix Park	Anne-Marie; Jamie Lawson; Beoga	184,187 / 184,187	$17,090,104
24 May	Manchester	England	Etihad Stadium	Anne-Marie; Jamie Lawson	215,600 / 215,600	$19,806,800
25 May	Manchester	England	Etihad Stadium	Anne-Marie; Jamie Lawson	215,600 / 215,600	$19,806,800
26 May	Manchester	England	Etihad Stadium	Anne-Marie; Jamie Lawson	215,600 / 215,600	$19,806,800
27 May	Manchester	England	Etihad Stadium	Anne-Marie; Jamie Lawson	215,600 / 215,600	$19,806,800
1 June	Glasgow	Scotland	Hampden Park	Anne-Marie; Jamie Lawson	152,024 / 152,024	$13,746,027
2 June	Glasgow	Scotland	Hampden Park	Anne-Marie; Jamie Lawson	152,024 / 152,024	$13,746,027
3 June	Glasgow	Scotland	Hampden Park	Anne-Marie; Jamie Lawson	152,024 / 152,024	$13,746,027
8 June	Newcastle	England	St. James Park	Anne-Marie; Jamie Lawson	149,226 / 149,226	$13,498,865
9 June	Newcastle	England	St. James Park	Anne-Marie; Jamie Lawson	149,226 / 149,226	$13,498,865
10 June	Newcastle	England	St. James Park	Anne-Marie; Jamie Lawson	149,226 / 149,226	$13,498,865
14 June	London	England	Wembley Stadium	Anne-Marie; Jamie Lawson	299,013 / 299,013	$28,726,438
15 June	London	England	Wembley Stadium	Anne-Marie; Jamie Lawson	299,013 / 299,013	$28,726,438
16 June	London	England	Wembley Stadium	Anne-Marie; Jamie Lawson	299,013 / 299,013	$28,726,438
17 June	London	England	Wembley Stadium	Anne-Marie; Jamie Lawson	299,013 / 299,013	$28,726,438
21 June	Cardiff	Wales	Principality Stadium	Anne-Marie; Jamie Lawson	238,085 / 238,085	$21,249,947
22 June	Cardiff	Wales	Principality Stadium	Anne-Marie; Jamie Lawson	238,085 / 238,085	$21,249,947
23 June	Cardiff	Wales	Principality Stadium	Anne-Marie; Jamie Lawson	238,085 / 238,085	$21,249,947
24 June	Cardiff	Wales	Principality Stadium	Anne-Marie; Jamie Lawson	238,085 / 238,085	$21,249,947
28 June	Amsterdam	Netherlands	Amsterdam Arena	Anne-Marie; Jamie Lawson	102,463 / 102,463	$7,722,001
29 June	Amsterdam	Netherlands	Amsterdam Arena	Anne-Marie; Jamie Lawson	102,463 / 102,463	$7,722,001
1 July	Werchter	Belgium	Werchter Festival Ground	Anne-Marie; Jamie Lawson	64,987 / 64,987	$5,470,934
6 July	Saint-Denis	France	Stade de France	Anne-Marie; Jamie Lawson	153,065 / 153,065	$9,308,969
7 July	Saint-Denis	France	Stade de France	Anne-Marie; Jamie Lawson	153,065 / 153,065	$9,308,969
10 July	Gothenburg	Sweden	Ullevi	Anne-Marie; Jamie Lawson	122,952 / 122,952	$10,969,078
11 July	Gothenburg	Sweden	Ullevi	Anne-Marie; Jamie Lawson	122,952 / 122,952	$10,969,078
14 July	Stockholm	Sweden	Friends Arena	Anne-Marie; Jamie Lawson	54,234 / 54,234	$4,818,972
19 July	Berlin	Germany	Olympiastadion	Anne-Marie; Jamie Lawson	69,055 / 69,780	$6,392,576
22 July	Gelsenkirchen	Germany	Veltins-Arena	Anne-Marie; Jamie Lawson	102,778 / 112,406	$9,001,427
23 July	Gelsenkirchen	Germany	Veltins-Arena	Anne-Marie; Jamie Lawson	102,778 / 112,406	$9,001,427
25 July	Hamburg	Germany	Trabrennbahn Bahrenfeld	Anne-Marie; Jamie Lawson	80,326 / 80,413	$7,024,739
29 July	Munich	Germany	Olympiastadion	Anne-Marie; Jamie Lawson	135,036 / 135,164	$12,865,527
30 July	Munich	Germany	Olympiastadion	Anne-Marie; Jamie Lawson	135,036 / 135,164	$12,865,527
3 August	Zurich	Switzerland	Letzigrund	Anne-Marie; Jamie Lawson	95,142 / 95,458	$11,097,894
4 August	Zurich	Switzerland	Letzigrund	Anne-Marie; Jamie Lawson	95,142 / 95,458	$11,097,894
7 August	Vienna	Austria	Ernst-Happel-Stadion	Anne-Marie; Jamie Lawson	110,652 / 110,652	$9,570,146
8 August	Vienna	Austria	Ernst-Happel-Stadion	Anne-Marie; Jamie Lawson	110,652 / 110,652	$9,570,146
11 August	Warsaw	Poland	PGE Narodowy	Anne-Marie; Jamie Lawson; BeMy	104,452 / 104,452	$7,470,882
12 August	Warsaw	Poland	PGE Narodowy	Anne-Marie; Jamie Lawson; BeMy	104,452 / 104,452	$7,470,882
18 August	Pasadena	United States	Rose Bowl	Snow Patrol; Anne-Marie	62,321 / 62,321	$6,315,595
21 August	San Francisco	United States	AT&T Park	Snow Patrol; Anne-Marie	38,647 / 38,647	$4,199,073
25 August	Seattle	United States	CenturyLink Field	Snow Patrol; Anne-Marie	55,891 / 55,891	$4,932,401
30 August	Toronto	Canada	Rogers Centre	Snow Patrol; Anne-Marie	98,461 / 98,461	$8,459,818
31 August	Toronto	Canada	Rogers Centre	Snow Patrol; Anne-Marie	98,461 / 98,461	$8,459,818
6 September	St. Louis	United States	Busch Stadium	Snow Patrol; Anne-Marie	41,522 / 41,522	$3,726,270
8 September	Detroit	United States	Ford Field	Snow Patrol; Anne-Marie	47,804 / 47,804	$4,481,289
14 September	Foxborough	United States	Gillette Stadium	Snow Patrol; Anne-Marie	110,238 / 110,238	$9,832,549
15 September	Foxborough	United States	Gillette Stadium	Snow Patrol; Anne-Marie	110,238 / 110,238	$9,832,549
21 September	East Rutherford	United States	MetLife Stadium	Snow Patrol; Anne-Marie	107,500 / 107,500	$11,220,207
22 September	East Rutherford	United States	MetLife Stadium	Snow Patrol; Anne-Marie	107,500 / 107,500	$11,220,207
27 September	Philadelphia	United States	Lincoln Financial Field	Snow Patrol; Anne-Marie	54,292 / 54,292	$5,161,682
29 September (Note: The show on 29 September 2018, in Pittsburgh at PNC Park was originally scheduled for 30 September 2018, but was rescheduled to accommodate the Pittsburgh Steelers when their Sunday Night Football at Heinz Field's kickoff time was allocated for 8:20 p.m.)	Pittsburgh	United States	PNC Park	Snow Patrol; Anne-Marie	41,014 / 41,014	$4,169,873
4 October	Chicago	United States	Soldier Field	Snow Patrol; Lauv	47,263 / 47,263	$4,339,349
6 October	Nashville	United States	Nissan Stadium	Snow Patrol; Lauv	45,888 / 45,888	$3,954,931
13 October	Kansas City	United States	Arrowhead Stadium	Snow Patrol; Lauv	51,324 / 51,324	$4,008,747
17 October	Fargo	United States	Fargodome	Snow Patrol; Lauv	17,761 / 17,761	$1,766,790
20 October	Minneapolis	United States	U.S. Bank Stadium	Snow Patrol; Lauv	49,359 / 49,359	$4,512,421
24 October (Note: The show was originally scheduled for 23 October 2018, in Milwaukee at Miller Park, was rescheduled to give more time for stage setup after the 2018 National League Championship Series ended 20 October (it would have moved to November had the Brewers advanced to the 2018 World Series).)	Milwaukee	United States	Miller Park	Snow Patrol	37,288 / 37,288	$3,390,498
27 October	Arlington	United States	AT&T Stadium	Snow Patrol; Lauv	46,249 / 46,249	$4,528,560
31 October	New Orleans	United States	Mercedes-Benz Superdome	Snow Patrol; Lauv	42,295 / 42,295	$2,827,815
3 November	Houston	United States	Minute Maid Park	Snow Patrol; Lauv	39,354 / 39,354	$3,985,595
7 November	Tampa	United States	Raymond James Stadium	Snow Patrol; Lauv	51,120 / 51,120	$4,197,412
9 November	Atlanta	United States	Mercedes-Benz Stadium	Snow Patrol; Lauv	50,906 / 50,906	$5,021,395

List of 2019 concerts
Dates (2019)	City	Country	Venue	Opening act(s)	Attendance	Revenue
13 February	São Paulo	Brazil	Allianz Parque	Passenger	81,156 / 81,156	$6,435,571
14 February	São Paulo	Brazil	Allianz Parque	Passenger	81,156 / 81,156	$6,435,571
17 February	Porto Alegre	Brazil	Arena do Grêmio	Passenger	38,635 / 38,635	$3,103,947
20 February	Montevideo	Uruguay	Estadio Centenario	Passenger	20,779 / 20,779	$1,887,584
23 February	Buenos Aires	Argentina	Campo Argentino de Polo	Passenger	40,130 / 40,130	$2,516,252
23 March	Johannesburg	South Africa	FNB Stadium	Passenger; Shekhinah	128,977 / 130,178	$7,721,755
24 March	Johannesburg	South Africa	FNB Stadium	Passenger; Shekhinah	128,977 / 130,178	$7,721,755
27 March	Cape Town	South Africa	Cape Town Stadium	Passenger; Shekhinah	96,915 / 98,264	$5,375,129
28 March	Cape Town	South Africa	Cape Town Stadium	Passenger; Shekhinah	96,915 / 98,264	$5,375,129
4 April	Taoyuan	Taiwan	Taoyuan City Stadium	One Ok Rock	28,136 / 28,136	$3,209,967
9 April	Tokyo	Japan	Tokyo Dome	One Ok Rock	47,454 / 47,454	$6,125,211
13 April	Kuala Lumpur	Malaysia	Bukit Jalil National Stadium	One Ok Rock	40,351 / 43,743	$2,896,413
17 April	Hong Kong		Hong Kong Disneyland	One Ok Rock	20,294 / 20,294	$2,850,290
21 April	Incheon	South Korea	Songdo Moonlight Festival Park	One Ok Rock	24,910 / 25,033	$2,657,726
23 April	Osaka	Japan	Kyocera Dome	One Ok Rock	37,790 / 37,790	$4,902,433
26 April	Singapore		Singapore National Stadium	One Ok Rock	49,810 / 49,810	$5,595,968
28 April	Bangkok	Thailand	Rajamangala Stadium	One Ok Rock	29,119 / 32,691	$3,586,298
3 May	Jakarta	Indonesia	Gelora Bung Karno Stadium	One Ok Rock	48,959 / 52,060	$4,754,628
24 May	Lyon	France	Groupama Stadium	James Bay; Zara Larsson	157,070 / 162,561	$11,665,699
25 May	Lyon	France	Groupama Stadium	James Bay; Zara Larsson	157,070 / 162,561	$11,665,699
26 May	Lyon	France	Groupama Stadium	James Bay; Zara Larsson	157,070 / 162,561	$11,665,699
29 May	Bordeaux	France	Matmut Atlantique	James Bay; Zara Larsson	41,449 / 41,716	$3,117,590
1 June	Lisbon	Portugal	Estádio da Luz	James Bay; Zara Larsson; Ben Kweller	118,085 / 118,085	$8,929,969
2 June	Lisbon	Portugal	Estádio da Luz	James Bay; Zara Larsson; Ben Kweller	118,085 / 118,085	$8,929,969
7 June	Barcelona	Spain	Estadi Olímpic Lluís Companys	James Bay; Zara Larsson	54,658 / 54,658	$4,126,519
11 June	Madrid	Spain	Wanda Metropolitano	James Bay; Zara Larsson	51,944 / 51,944	$3,793,349
14 June (Note: The show on 14 June 2019, in Florence at Ippodromo dele Casine is part of Firenze Rocks 2019.)	Florence	Italy	Ippodromo del Visarno	—N/a	—N/a	—N/a
16 June	Rome	Italy	Stadio Olimpico	James Bay; Zara Larsson	58,959 / 58,959	$4,549,349
19 June	Milan	Italy	Stadio Giuseppe Meazza	James Bay; Zara Larsson	54,892 / 54,892	$4,020,920
22 June	Hockenheim	Germany	Hockenheimring	James Bay; Zara Larsson	191,120 / 202,888	$16,289,639
23 June	Hockenheim	Germany	Hockenheimring	James Bay; Zara Larsson	191,120 / 202,888	$16,289,639
28 June	Klagenfurt	Austria	Wörthersee Stadion	James Bay; Zara Larsson	67,535 / 67,698	$6,279,570
29 June	Klagenfurt	Austria	Wörthersee Stadion	James Bay; Zara Larsson	67,535 / 67,698	$6,279,570
3 July	Bucharest	Romania	Arena Națională	James Bay; Zara Larsson	47,166 / 48,106	$2,942,900
7 July	Prague	Czechia	Letňany	James Bay; Zara Larsson	142,036 / 157,980	$11,419,946
8 July	Prague	Czechia	Letňany	James Bay; Zara Larsson	142,036 / 157,980	$11,419,946
12 July	Riga	Latvia	Lucavsala Park	James Bay; Zara Larsson	50,437 / 63,550	$3,982,564
19 July	Moscow	Russia	Otkritie Arena	James Bay; Zara Larsson	39,841 / 41,857	$3,585,231
23 July	Helsinki	Finland	Malmi Airport	James Bay; Zara Larsson	108,000 / 118,216	$9,481,707
24 July	Helsinki	Finland	Malmi Airport	James Bay; Zara Larsson	108,000 / 118,216	$9,481,707
27 July	Odense	Denmark	Tusindårsskoven	James Bay; Zara Larsson	87,401 / 87,401	$8,848,720
28 July	Odense	Denmark	Tusindårsskoven	James Bay; Zara Larsson	87,401 / 87,401	$8,848,720
2 August	Hanover	Germany	Messegelände	James Bay; Zara Larsson	131,538 / 148,720	$12,560,432
3 August	Hanover	Germany	Messegelände	James Bay; Zara Larsson	131,538 / 148,720	$12,560,432
7 August (Note: The show on 7 August 2019, in Budapest at Hajógyári Island is part of Sziget Festival 2019.)	Budapest	Hungary	Sziget Festival	—N/a	—N/a	—N/a
10 August	Reykjavik	Iceland	Laugardalsvöllur	James Bay; Zara Larsson	43,830 / 56,642	$7,180,912
11 August	Reykjavik	Iceland	Laugardalsvöllur	James Bay; Zara Larsson	43,830 / 56,642	$7,180,912
16 August	Leeds	England	Roundhay Park	The Darkness; Lewis Capaldi	136,358 / 140,000	$12,405,249
17 August	Leeds	England	Roundhay Park	The Darkness; Lewis Capaldi	136,358 / 140,000	$12,405,249
23 August	Ipswich	England	Chantry Park	The Darkness; Passenger	139,984 / 181,548	$12,913,212
24 August	Ipswich	England	Chantry Park	The Darkness; Passenger	139,984 / 181,548	$12,913,212
25 August	Ipswich	England	Chantry Park	The Darkness; Lewis Capaldi	139,984 / 181,548	$12,913,212
26 August	Ipswich	England	Chantry Park	The Darkness; Lewis Capaldi	139,984 / 181,548	$12,913,212
Total					8,908,150 / 9,078,636 (98.12%)	$776,195,930

== Cancelled shows ==
List of cancelled concerts
Date	City	Country	Venue	Reason	Ref.
17 September 2017	St. Louis	United States	Scottrade Center	Safety concerns	
22 October 2017	Taipei	Taiwan	Nangang Exhibition Center	Arm fracture from a bike accident	
29 October 2017	Seoul	South Korea	KSPO Dome	Arm fracture from a bike accident	
4 November 2017	Hong Kong		AsiaWorld–Arena	Arm fracture from a bike accident	
5 November 2017	Hong Kong		AsiaWorld–Arena	Arm fracture from a bike accident	
9 November 2017	Jakarta	Indonesia	Indonesia Convention Exhibition	Arm fracture from a bike accident	
18 April 2019	Hong Kong		Hong Kong Disneyland	Lightning storm	

== See also ==
- List of highest-grossing concert tours
- List of most-attended concert tours
