= UK singles chart records and statistics =

The UK singles chart was first compiled in 1969. However, the records and statistics listed here date back to 1952 because the Official Charts Company counts a selected period of the New Musical Express chart (only from 1952 to 1960) and the Record Retailer chart from 1960 to 1969 as predecessors for the period prior to 11 February 1969, when multiples of competing charts coexisted side by side. For example, the BBC compiled its own chart based on an average of the music papers of the time; many songs announced as having reached number one on BBC Radio and Top of the Pops prior to 1969 may not be listed here as chart-toppers since they do not meet the legacy criteria of the Charts Company.

== Number one hits ==
=== Most number ones ===
The following is a list of all the acts who are on 10 or more UK number one songs with an individual credit (meaning, the main artist or named separately as a featured artist – being part of a group does not count towards an individual's total).

Simply playing or singing on a single without credit will not count, or the top positions would almost certainly belong to session musicians such as Clem Cattini who is reported to have played drums on over 40 number ones.

Total	Artist
21	Elvis Presley (Note: This number is disputed by some chart historians, as it includes three songs that were number ones twice due to a re-issue campaign in early 2005, setting Presley's score at 18 number one hits.)
18	The Beatles
14	Cliff Richard
14	Westlife
14	Ed Sheeran
13	Madonna
12	Take That
11	Calvin Harris
11	Eminem
10	Elton John

=== Most weeks at number one by artist ===
Rank	Artist	Weeks at No. 1
1	Elvis Presley	80
2	The Beatles	70
3	Ed Sheeran	61
4	Cliff Richard	46
5	Calvin Harris	39
5	Justin Bieber	39
7	Frankie Laine	32
8	ABBA	31
8	Drake	31
10	Madonna	29
10	Take That	29

=== Most weeks at number one by single ===
The record for most weeks at number one is 23, attained by Sam Fender and Olivia Dean's "Rein Me In" in 2026, non-consecutively. After taking 35 weeks to reach the top of the chart, it spent an initial three weeks at number one before dropping to number two for a week, then returning for five weeks at number one, dropped back down to number two for another week, rose back to number one for a further five weeks, dropped down yet again for two more weeks at number two and one at number four, before rising back to number one for ten consecutive weeks.

The longest unbroken run at number one is "(Everything I Do) I Do It for You" by Bryan Adams, which spent 16 consecutive weeks in 1991.

Ed Sheeran is the only artist to ever have multiple songs spend 10 or more weeks at the top of the charts, achieving the feat with both "Shape of You" in 2017 and "Bad Habits" in 2021.

Weeks	Artist	Single	Year
23	Sam Fender and Olivia Dean	"Rein Me In" ‡	2026
18	Frankie Laine	"I Believe" ‡	1953
16	Bryan Adams	"(Everything I Do) I Do It for You"	1991
15	Wet Wet Wet	"Love Is All Around"	1994
15	Drake (featuring Wizkid and Kyla)	"One Dance"	2016
14	Queen	"Bohemian Rhapsody" ‡	1975–76 and 1991–92 (Note: The 1975–76 original release of "Bohemian Rhapsody" spent 9 weeks atop the chart. The 1991–92 re-release of "Bohemian Rhapsody", as a double A-side with "These Are the Days of Our Lives" spent 5 weeks atop the chart.)
14	Ed Sheeran	"Shape of You" ‡	2017
13	Alex Warren	"Ordinary" ‡	2025
12	Wham!	"Last Christmas" ‡	2021–2025
11	Slim Whitman	"Rose Marie"	1955
11	Luis Fonsi and Daddy Yankee (featuring Justin Bieber)	"Despacito" ‡	2017
11	Tones and I	"Dance Monkey"	2019
11	Ed Sheeran	"Bad Habits"	2021
10	David Whitfield (with Mantovani and his Orchestra)	"Cara Mia"	1954
10	Whitney Houston	"I Will Always Love You"	1992–93
10	Rihanna (featuring Jay-Z)	"Umbrella"	2007
10	Harry Styles	"As It Was"	2022
10	Miley Cyrus	"Flowers"	2023
10	Dave and Central Cee	"Sprinter"	2023
10	Huntrix	"Golden" ‡	2025

Note: Songs denoted with a double dagger (‡) spent non-consecutive weeks at number one.

=== Biggest climb to number one ===
"Mandy" by Westlife is the single with the longest leap to the top (from No. 200 to No. 1 for the week ending 22 November 2003) in UK music history. This was due to sales 'leaks'; a relatively small number of singles being accidentally sold the day before the embargo date.

The single with the biggest climb to number one is "Marvin Gaye" by Charlie Puth featuring Meghan Trainor, which climbed from number 90 on the week ending 20 August 2015.

The biggest climb to number one within the top 40 goes to "So What" by Pink, which climbed from number 38 on the week ending 11 October 2008.

=== Biggest drop from number one ===
The biggest drop from number one within the top 100 is to number 97. "Three Lions" by Baddiel, Skinner and The Lightning Seeds returned to number one for a third non-consecutive week on the week ending 19 July 2018, but in the following week it experienced a large drop after England's loss at the semifinals of the 2018 FIFA World Cup. However, two singles have since fallen completely out of the chart after a week at number one: "Last Christmas" by Wham! on the weeks ending 14 January 2021 and 12 January 2023, and "Merry Christmas" by Ed Sheeran and Elton John on the week ending 13 January 2022.

=== Longest climb to number one ===
"All I Want for Christmas Is You" by Mariah Carey reached number one on its 104th non-consecutive week on the chart, debuting on the week ending 10 December 1994 and peaking on week ending 17 December 2020.

The longest climb to number one in a consecutive chart run is 36 weeks, achieved by Sam Fender and Olivia Dean's "Rein Me In", which debuted on the week ending 26 June 2025 and peaked on the week ending 26 February 2026.

In terms of overall surpassed time, the record is held by "Running Up That Hill" by Kate Bush, which first charted on the week ending 17 August 1985 and reached number one on the week ending 23 June 2022, almost 37 years since its first appearance on the chart.

=== Self-replacement at number one ===
Since the inception of the UK Singles Chart in 1952 only seven acts have replaced themselves at the top of the UK charts with exactly the same billing (as opposed to featured credits or backing credits, for example 'Cliff Richard and the Shadows' and 'The Shadows' have had back to back number ones on four occasions):

- The Beatles – "I Want to Hold Your Hand" replaced "She Loves You" (14 December 1963)
- John Lennon – "Woman" replaced "Imagine" (7 February 1981)
- Elvis Presley – "One Night" / "I Got Stung" replaced "Jailhouse Rock" (22 January 2005)
- Justin Bieber – "Love Yourself" replaced "Sorry" (10 December 2015)
- Ariana Grande – "Break Up with Your Girlfriend, I'm Bored" replaced "7 Rings" (21 February 2019); "7 Rings" replaced "Break Up with Your Girlfriend, I'm Bored" (28 February 2019)
- Ed Sheeran – "Shivers" replaced "Bad Habits" (23 September 2021)
- Sabrina Carpenter – "Espresso" replaced "Please Please Please" (18 July 2024); "Please Please Please" replaced "Espresso" (1 August 2024)

In addition, Ariana Grande is the first female artist to replace herself, and the first artist to replace herself at Number 1 for two consecutive weeks.

=== Songwriters with the most number one singles ===
Double A-sides and EPs count as one single rather than separate songs, and songs that have been number one for multiple artists are included as separate singles.

Number of singles	Songwriter	Weeks at number one
31	John Lennon	105
30	Paul McCartney	110
25	Max Martin	65
19	Ed Sheeran	76
17	Steve Mac	49
14	Calvin Harris	42
14	Dr. Luke	25
14	Wayne Hector	19
13	Benny Andersson	46
13	Björn Ulvaeus	46
13	Madonna	29
13	Gary Barlow	28

=== Most consecutive number ones ===
The Beatles had 11 consecutive number ones with official releases on Parlophone between 1963 ("From Me to You") and 1966 ("Yellow Submarine" / "Eleanor Rigby"), though releases of archive material from their previous record company also charted during this time.

Even including the archive releases, they still have the most consecutive number ones with 7, from "A Hard Day's Night" in 1964 up to "Yellow Submarine" / " Eleanor Rigby" in 1966. They share this record with Westlife, who achieved this from their 1999 debut "Swear It Again" up to 2000's "My Love".

=== Most consecutive number ones from chart debut ===
Spice Girls became the first British music act and girl group to have their first six singles reach number one on the UK singles chart between 1996 and 1997 with "Wannabe" in July 1996 to "Too Much" in December 1997.

Westlife became the first music act to have their first seven singles ("Swear It Again", "If I Let You Go", "Flying Without Wings", "I Have a Dream / "Seasons in the Sun", "Fool Again", "Against All Odds" and "My Love") to reach number one from 1999 to 2000. It took Westlife just over 18 months to achieve their first seven number ones, faster than any other music act.

=== Most songs to debut at number 1 on the chart ===
Acts with the most songs to debut at number 1 on the Official Singles Chart. Westlife claim the most number 1 debuts on the Official Singles Chart, with all 14 of their chart-toppers landing there in their first week.

Total	Artist
14	Westlife
10	Take That
9	Eminem
8	Spice Girls
8	Oasis
8	Ed Sheeran
8	Ariana Grande
7	McFly
7	Robbie Williams
7	Calvin Harris
7	Tinie Tempah
7	Sam Smith
7	Taylor Swift

=== Most number-one singles from one album ===
The following artists have had at least 3 number-one singles in the UK with a single album. No soundtracks have had 4 number-one singles as of today. Lady Gaga's The Fame and The Fame Monster are considered to be one album by the Official Charts Company. George Michael is credited as a sole singer for some number-one songs that are tracks on Wham! albums. Although "Merry Christmas" by Ed Sheeran and Elton John was a number-one single on a Christmas edition of Sheeran's album =, the special edition was later removed from stores, and the song is now listed as a single from John's album The Lockdown Sessions, therefore removing the third number-one single credit from Sheeran's album.

Total	Artists	Albums	Years
5	Westlife	Westlife	1999–2000
4	Take That	Everything Changes	1993–1994
4	Spice Girls	Spice	1996–1997
4	B*Witched	B*Witched	1998–1999
4	Dizzee Rascal	Tongue n' Cheek	2008–2010
4	Lady Gaga	The Fame/The Fame Monster	2009–2010
3	Wham!	Make It Big	1984
3	Frankie Goes to Hollywood	Welcome to the Pleasuredome	1984
3	Madonna	True Blue	1986–1987
3	Take That	Nobody Else	1994–1995
3	Aqua	Aquarium	1997–1998
3	Spice Girls	Spiceworld	1997–1998
3	All Saints	All Saints	1998
3	S Club 7	Sunshine	2000–2001
3	McFly	Motion in the Ocean	2006–2007
3	Leona Lewis	Spirit	2006–2008
3	Black Eyed Peas	The E.N.D.	2009
3	Alexandra Burke	Overcome	2008–2010
3	Bruno Mars	Doo-Wops & Hooligans	2010–2011
3	Calvin Harris	Motion	2013–2014
3	Sam Smith	In the Lonely Hour	2014–2015
3	Justin Bieber	Purpose	2015
3	Drake	Scorpion	2018
3	Ariana Grande	Thank U, Next	2018–2019
3	Ed Sheeran	No.6 Collaborations Project	2019
3	Wham!	The Final	1985–1986; 2021
3	Lewis Capaldi	Broken by Desire to Be Heavenly Sent	2022–2023
3	Sabrina Carpenter	Short n' Sweet	2024
3	Taylor Swift	The Life of a Showgirl	2025–2026

=== Longest span of number one singles ===
The Beatles have the longest time span of number one singles with 60 years between their first, "From Me to You" in May 1963, and their most recent, "Now and Then" in November 2023.

Elvis Presley has the longest timespan of number one singles for a solo artist, with over 47 years between his first number one "All Shook Up" in June 1957 and his most recent, the reissue of "It's Now or Never" in January 2005.

Kate Bush has the longest time span of number one singles for a female artist, with 44 years between her first number one "Wuthering Heights" in April 1978 and her second and most recent "Running Up That Hill" in June 2022.

=== Longest gap between two number one singles ===
The Beatles have the longest gap between two number ones, with 54 years between "The Ballad of John and Yoko" in June 1969 and "Now and Then" in November 2023.

Kate Bush has the longest gap between two number ones for a solo artist, with 44 years between her first "Wuthering Heights" in April 1978 and her second "Running Up That Hill" in June 2022.

Tom Jones has the longest gap between two number ones for a male artist, with over 42 years between "Green, Green Grass of Home" in December 1966 and his featured appearance on "(Barry) Islands in the Stream" in March 2009.

=== Lowest-selling number one ===
The lowest weekly sale for a number one single is 17,694 copies held by Orson's "No Tomorrow" in 2006.

The addition of downloads to the UK charts meant that singles could reach number one with no physical copy being released. The first single to achieve this was Gnarls Barkley's "Crazy" in early 2006. Since 2014, audio streaming has been included in the calculation of chart position, so it is now possible for a single to reach number one without selling any copies (if it were only available on streaming services). In the week ending 24 September 2015, "What Do You Mean?" by Justin Bieber became the first number one with over half of its chart sales made up of streaming points, with sales of 30,000 and 36,000 points from 3.6 million streams.

Since the incorporation of streaming into the singles chart, the Official Charts Company have continued to compile a sales only chart. In week ending 27 April 2017 "Sign of the Times" by Harry Styles became the first number one in the sales-only chart to sell less than "No Tomorrow" by Orson, with 16,686 copies.

=== Longest and shortest songs to reach number one ===
In terms of a song's running length, "All Around the World" by Oasis (1998) at 9 minutes and 38 seconds is the longest song to reach No.1. "What Do You Want?" by Adam Faith at 1 minute 35 seconds (1959) is the shortest.

=== Non-English language number ones ===
- "Je t'aime... moi non plus" – Serge Gainsbourg and Jane Birkin (French – 11 October 1969 for one week)
- "Chanson D'Amour" – The Manhattan Transfer (French/English – 12 March 1977 for three weeks)
- "Begin the Beguine (Volver a Empezar)" – Julio Iglesias (Spanish/English – 5 December 1981 for one week)
- "Rock Me Amadeus" – Falco (German/English – 10 May 1986 for one week)
- "La Bamba" – Los Lobos (Spanish – 1 August 1987 for two weeks)
- "Sadeness (Part I)" – Enigma (French/Latin/English – 19 January 1991 for one week)
- "The Ketchup Song (Aserejé)" – Las Ketchup (Spanish/English – 19 October 2002 for one week)
- "We No Speak Americano" – Yolanda Be Cool and DCUP (Neapolitan/English – 31 July 2010 for one week)
- "Loca People" – Sak Noel (Spanish/English – 2 October 2011 for one week)
- "Gangnam Style" – Psy (Korean/English – 6 October 2012 for one week)
- "Despacito" – Luis Fonsi and Daddy Yankee featuring Justin Bieber (Spanish/English – 18 May 2017 for eleven non-consecutive weeks)

=== Songs that were number one for multiple artists ===
- "I Believe" – Frankie Laine (1953) and Robson & Jerome (1995)
- "Answer Me" – David Whitfield and Frankie Laine (both 1953)
- "This Ole House" – Rosemary Clooney (1954) and Shakin' Stevens (1981)
- "Cherry Pink (and Apple Blossom White)" – Pérez Prado and Eddie Calvert (both 1955)
- "Unchained Melody" – Jimmy Young (1955), The Righteous Brothers (1990), Robson & Jerome (1995) and Gareth Gates (2002)
- "Singing the Blues" – Guy Mitchell and Tommy Steele (both 1957)
- "Young Love" – Tab Hunter (1957) and Donny Osmond (1973)
- "Mary's Boy Child" – Harry Belafonte (1957) and Boney M. (1978)
- "Living Doll" – Cliff Richard (1959 with The Shadows, 1986 with The Young Ones)
- "Can't Help Falling in Love" – Elvis Presley (1962) and UB40 (1993)
- "You'll Never Walk Alone" – Gerry and the Pacemakers (1963), The Crowd (1985), Robson & Jerome (1996) and Michael Ball with Captain Tom Moore (2020)
- "I Got You Babe" – Sonny & Cher (1965) and UB40 with Chrissie Hynde (1985)
- "Somethin' Stupid" – Frank Sinatra with Nancy Sinatra (1967) and Robbie Williams with Nicole Kidman (2001)
- "What a Wonderful World" – Louis Armstrong (1968) and Katie Melua with Eva Cassidy (2007)
- "Baby Come Back" – The Equals (1968) and Pato Banton (1994)
- "With a Little Help from My Friends" – Joe Cocker (1968), Wet Wet Wet (1988) and Sam & Mark (2004)
- "Dizzy" – Tommy Roe (1969) and Vic Reeves with The Wonder Stuff (1991)
- "Bridge over Troubled Water" – Simon & Garfunkel (1970) and Artists for Grenfell (2017)
- "Spirit in the Sky" – Norman Greenbaum (1970), Doctor and the Medics (1986) and Gareth Gates (2003)
- "Without You" – Nilsson (1972) and Mariah Carey (1994)
- "Seasons in the Sun" – Terry Jacks (1974) and Westlife (1999)
- "Everything I Own" – Ken Boothe (1974) and Boy George (1987)
- "Barbados" – Typically Tropical (1975) and Vengaboys (1999, as "We're Going to Ibiza")
- "Tragedy" – Bee Gees (1979) and Steps (1999)
- "The Tide Is High" – Blondie (1980) and Atomic Kitten (2002)
- "Uptown Girl" – Billy Joel (1983) and Westlife (2001)
- "The Power of Love" – Frankie Goes to Hollywood (1984) and Gabrielle Aplin (2012)
- "Do They Know It's Christmas?" – Band Aid (1984), Band Aid II (1989), Band Aid 20 (2004), Band Aid 30 (2014) and LadBaby (2022, as "Food Aid")
- "When the Going Gets Tough" – Billy Ocean (1986) and Boyzone (1999)
- "He Ain't Heavy, He's My Brother" – The Hollies (1988) and The Justice Collective (2012)
- "Eternal Flame" – The Bangles (1989) and Atomic Kitten (2001)
- "You Are Not Alone" – Michael Jackson (1995) and The X Factor Finalists 2009 (2009)
- "Lady Marmalade" – All Saints (1998) and Christina Aguilera, Lil' Kim, Mya and Pink (2001)
- "Mambo No. 5" – Lou Bega (1999) and Bob the Builder (2001)
- "Against All Odds" – Mariah Carey with Westlife (2000) and Steve Brookstein (2005)
- "Fuck It (I Don't Want You Back)" – Eamon and Frankee (both 2004, Frankee's version titled "F.U.R.B. (Fuck You Right Back)")
- "Wake Me Up!" – Avicii (2013) and Gareth Malone's All Star Choir (2014)
- "Merry Christmas" – Ed Sheeran with Elton John and LadBaby featuring Ed Sheeran and Elton John (both 2021, LadBaby's version titled "Sausage Rolls for Everyone")

=== Acts to occupy the top two ===
- The Beatles
  - "I Want to Hold Your Hand" and "She Loves You" (three weeks in December 1963)
  - "Hello, Goodbye" and "Magical Mystery Tour" (three weeks in December 1967)
- John Travolta – "Summer Nights" (with Olivia Newton-John) and "Sandy" (one week in November 1978)
- John Lennon – "Imagine" and "Happy Xmas (War Is Over)"; "Woman" (both January 1981)
- Frankie Goes to Hollywood – "Two Tribes" and "Relax" (two weeks in July 1984)
- Madonna – "Into the Groove" and "Holiday" (one week in August 1985)
- Justin Bieber
  - "Sorry" and "Love Yourself" (one week in November 2015); "Love Yourself" and "Sorry" (five non-consecutive weeks in December 2015 and January 2016)
  - "Cold Water" (with MØ & Major Lazer) and "Let Me Love You" (with DJ Snake) (three weeks in August 2016)
  - "Despacito" (with Luis Fonsi & Daddy Yankee) and "I'm the One" (with DJ Khaled, Lil Wayne, Quavo & Chance the Rapper) (four weeks in May and June 2017)
- Ed Sheeran
  - "Shape of You" and "Castle on the Hill" (five weeks in January and February 2017); "How Would You Feel (Paean)" (one week in February 2017); "Galway Girl" (five weeks in March and April 2017)
  - "Perfect" and "River" (with Eminem) (three non-consecutive weeks in December 2017 and January 2018)
  - "Sausage Rolls for Everyone" (with LadBaby and Elton John) and "Merry Christmas" (with Elton John) (one week in December 2021)
- Ariana Grande – "Break Up with Your Girlfriend, I'm Bored" and "7 Rings" (one week in February 2019); "7 Rings" and "Break Up with Your Girlfriend, I'm Bored" (one week in February 2019)
- Adele – "Easy on Me" and "Oh My God" (one week in December 2021)
- Elton John – "Sausage Rolls for Everyone" (with LadBaby and Ed Sheeran) and "Merry Christmas" (with Ed Sheeran) (one week in December 2021)
- Harry Styles – "As It Was" and "Late Night Talking" (one week in May 2022)
- Taylor Swift
  - "Is It Over Now?" and "Now That We Don't Talk" (one week in November 2023)
  - "The Fate of Ophelia" and "Opalite" (one week in October 2025)
- Sabrina Carpenter – "Please Please Please" and "Espresso" (three weeks in June and July 2024); "Espresso" and "Please Please Please" (two weeks in July 2024); "Taste" and "Please Please Please" (two weeks in September 2024); "Taste" and "Espresso" (one week in September 2024)
- Olivia Dean – "Rein Me In" (with Sam Fender) and "So Easy (To Fall in Love)" (two weeks in February 2026)

In addition, in the final week that Justin Bieber was at No. 1 and No. 2 with "Love Yourself" and "Sorry", "What Do You Mean" was at No. 3. For the first three weeks that Ed Sheeran was at No. 1 and No. 2 with "Shape of You" and "Galway Girl", "Castle on the Hill" was at No. 3, and for the first of these three weeks Sheeran's "Perfect", "New Man" and "Happier" were at No. 4, No. 5 and No. 6 respectively, prompting a change in chart rules so that only 3 of an artist's songs can appear in the chart at one time. When Harry Styles occupied the top two he was also at No. 3 with "Music for a Sushi Restaurant". In the first two weeks Sabrina Carpenter occupied the top two in September, she was also at No. 3 with "Espresso", making her the first female artist to occupy the entire top 3. When Taylor Swift occupied the top 2 in October 2025, she was also at No. 3 with "Elizabeth Taylor".

=== Age records ===
- Captain Tom Moore is the oldest artist to reach number one. He was exactly 100 years old when his rendition of "You'll Never Walk Alone" with Michael Ball reached number one on the week ending 30 April 2020.
- Kate Bush is the oldest female artist to reach number one. She was age 63 years, 343 days when her 1985 single "Running Up That Hill" spent its third and final week at number one on the week ending 7 July 2022.
- Jimmy Osmond is the youngest artist to reach number one. He was age 9 years, 252 days when "Long Haired Lover from Liverpool" first reached number one on the week ending 23 December 1972.
- Helen Shapiro is the youngest female artist to reach number one. She was age 14 years, 323 days when "You Don't Know" first reached number one on the week ending 16 August 1961.

== Most weeks ==
=== Weeks on chart by single ===
- Most weeks in the chart by a single:
  - Top 100: "Mr. Brightside" by The Killers (532 weeks)
  - Top 75: "Mr. Brightside" by The Killers (271 weeks)
  - Top 40: "All I Want for Christmas Is You" by Mariah Carey (110 weeks)
    - Excluding Christmas songs: "Ordinary" by Alex Warren (92 weeks)
  - Top 20: "Fairytale of New York" by The Pogues featuring Kirsty MacColl (83 weeks)
    - Excluding Christmas songs: "Rein Me In" by Sam Fender and Olivia Dean (73 weeks)
  - Top 10: "Rein Me In" by Sam Fender and Olivia Dean (54 weeks)
- Longest consecutive run in the chart by a single:
  - Top 100: "Lose Control" by Teddy Swims (109 weeks)
  - Top 75: "Blinding Lights" by The Weeknd (103 weeks)
  - Top 40: "Rein Me In" by Sam Fender and Olivia Dean (74 weeks)
  - Top 20: "Rein Me In" by Sam Fender and Olivia Dean and "Man I Need" by Olivia Dean (47 weeks)
  - Top 10: "Rein Me In" by Sam Fender and Olivia Dean (39 weeks)

== Sales ==
=== Fastest selling singles ===
The fastest selling single in chart history is "Candle in the Wind 1997" by Elton John, which sold 1.55 million copies in its first week (it sold 658,000 on the first day of release, 13 September 1997).

The fastest selling debut single is "Anything Is Possible/Evergreen" by Will Young, which sold 1.11 million copies in its first week on sale. Publicity had built up due to the televised talent contest Pop Idol with 8.7 million people phoning in to vote for the finalists.

The fastest selling single by a girl group is the Spice Girls' "2 Become 1", which sold over 462,000 copies during its first week on sale and over 763,000 copies in a fortnight. In total, the single has sold over 1.2 million copies.

== Outside number one ==
=== Artists with the most number 2 singles ===
Number	Artist	Number one singles
17	Elvis Presley	21
12	Madonna	13
11	Kylie Minogue	8
11	Cliff Richard	14
9	Rihanna	9
8	Michael Jackson	7
7	Justin Timberlake	4
7	Calvin Harris	11
7	Ed Sheeran	14
6	Queen	6
6	Boyzone	6
6	Oasis	8
6	Robbie Williams	7
6	Justin Bieber	8

=== Songs with the most weeks at number two ===
The following songs have all spent at least six weeks at number two without going higher on the chart:

Number of weeks	Single	Artist	Year	Held off number 1 by
8	"Terry's Theme from Limelight"	Frank Chacksfield	1953	"I Believe" – Frankie Laine
7	"Love Letters in the Sand"	Pat Boone	1957	"All Shook Up" – Elvis Presley; "Diana" – Paul Anka
7	"I Swear"	All-4-One	1994	"Love Is All Around" – Wet Wet Wet
7	"Moves Like Jagger"	Maroon 5 featuring Christina Aguilera	2011	"Stay Awake" – Example; "All About Tonight" – Pixie Lott; "What Makes You Beautiful" – One Direction; "No Regrets" – Dappy; "Loca People" – Sak Noel; "We Found Love" – Rihanna featuring Calvin Harris
7	"Murder on the Dancefloor"	Sophie Ellis-Bextor	2001–02; 2024	"Gotta Get Thru This" – Daniel Bedingfield; "Stick Season" – Noah Kahan
7	"Apt."	Rosé and Bruno Mars	2024–25	"Sailor Song" – Gigi Perez; "That's So True" – Gracie Abrams; "Messy" – Lola Young
6	"Blowing Wild"	Frankie Laine	1954	"Oh Mein Papa" – Eddie Calvert
6	"Are You Sure?"	The Allisons	1961	"Walk Right Back" / "Ebony Eyes" – The Everly Brothers; "Wooden Heart" – Elvis Presley
6	"Ruby, Don't Take Your Love to Town"	Kenny Rogers and The First Edition	1969–70	"Sugar, Sugar" – The Archies; "Two Little Boys" – Rolf Harris
6	"The Floral Dance"	Brighouse and Rastrick Brass Band	1977–78	"Mull of Kintyre" / "Girls' School" – Wings
6	"The Smurf Song"	Father Abraham and The Smurfs	1978	"You're the One That I Want" – John Travolta and Olivia Newton-John
6	"I'm Too Sexy"	Right Said Fred	1991	"(Everything I Do) I Do It for You" – Bryan Adams
6	"Let Me Love You"	DJ Snake featuring Justin Bieber	2016	"Cold Water" – Major Lazer featuring Justin Bieber and MØ; "Closer" – The Chainsmokers featuring Halsey
6	"Stay"	The Kid Laroi and Justin Bieber	2021	"Bad Habits" – Ed Sheeran
6	"Peru"	Fireboy DML and Ed Sheeran	2022	"We Don't Talk About Bruno" – Carolina Gaitán, Mauro Castillo, Adassa, Rhenzy Feliz, Diane Guerrero and Stephanie Beatriz; "Starlight" – Dave
6	"Good Luck, Babe!"	Chappell Roan	2024	"Please Please Please" – Sabrina Carpenter; "Backbone" – Chase & Status and Stormzy; "Taste" – Sabrina Carpenter

- Note: Some songs also spent at least six weeks at number two, but do not appear on this list as they have previously reached number one in the chart. The most recent example of this is Chappell Roan's "Pink Pony Club", which would have also appeared on this list after spending eight weeks at number two – which would have tied it with "Terry's Theme from Limelight" for having the most weeks at number two. It, however, spent two weeks at number one, thus excluding it from this list.

=== Most top ten singles ===
Number of singles	Artist
76	Elvis Presley
68	Cliff Richard
65	Madonna
50	Drake
45	Michael Jackson
43	Ed Sheeran
37	Kylie Minogue
37	Taylor Swift
36	Elton John
34	Eminem

=== Acts to peak across the entire top ten ===
Acts who have peaked at every position in the Top 10
Artist	No. 1	No. 2	No. 3	No. 4	No. 5	No. 6	No. 7	No. 8	No. 9	No. 10
Lonnie Donegan	"Cumberland Gap"	"Lost John" / "Stewball"	"Tom Dooley"	"Don't You Rock Me Daddy-O"	"I Wanna Go Home (Wreck of the John B)"	"The Grand Coolie Dam"	"Bring a Little Water Sylvie" / "Dead or Alive"	"Rock Island Line"	"The Party's Over"	"My Dixie Darling"
Elvis Presley	"All Shook Up"	"Heartbreak Hotel"	"(Let Me Be Your) Teddy Bear"	"A Big Hunk o' Love"	"Until It's Time for You to Go"	"Too Much"	"Santa Bring My Baby Back (To Me)"	"Paralyzed"	"Blue Suede Shoes"	"Kissin' Cousins"
Madonna	"Into the Groove"	"Crazy for You"	"Like a Virgin"	"Gambler"	"Angel"	"Deeper and Deeper"	"Rain"	"Human Nature"	"The Look of Love"	"Bad Girl"
Mariah Carey	"Without You"	"I'll Be There"	"Endless Love"	"Fantasy"	"Heartbreaker"	"One Sweet Day"	"Hero"	"Anytime You Need a Friend"	"Vision of Love"	"Thank God I Found You"
Tom Jones	"It's Not Unusual"	"I'll Never Fall in Love Again"	"Sex Bomb"	"Mama Told Me Not to Come"	"Help Yourself"	"The Young New Mexican Puppeteer"	"Funny Familiar Forgotten Feelings"	"Detroit City"	"Love Me Tonight"	"Without Love (There Is Nothing)"
Elton John	"Don't Go Breaking My Heart"	"Rocket Man"	"Nikita"	"Daniel"	"Crocodile Rock"	"Goodbye Yellow Brick Road"	"Saturday Night's Alright for Fighting"	"Blue Eyes"	"I Want Love"	"Lucy in the Sky with Diamonds"
U2	"Desire"	"Hold Me, Thrill Me, Kiss Me, Kill Me"	"Pride (In the Name of Love)"	"With or Without You"	"Walk On"	"The Unforgettable Fire"	"One"	"Even Better Than the Real Thing"	"Angel of Harlem"	"New Year's Day"
Cliff Richard	"Living Doll"	"Move It"	"Nine Times Out of Ten"	"Gee Whizz It's You"	"Santa's List"	"I Could Easily Fall (In Love with You)"	"High Class Baby"	"I'm the Lonely One"	"It's All Over"	"Mean Streak"
Pink	"Lady Marmalade"	"Get the Party Started"	"Feel Good Time"	"Stupid Girls"	"Most Girls"	"There You Go"	"Trouble"	"Try"	"You Make Me Sick"	"U + Ur Hand"
Usher	"You Make Me Wanna..."	"Pop Ya Collar"	"U Remind Me"	"I Need a Girl (Part One)" / "U Don't Have to Call"	"U Got It Bad"	"Without You"	"DJ Got Us Fallin' in Love"	"I Don't Mind"	"Caught Up"	"Good Kisser"
Taylor Swift	"Look What You Made Me Do"	"Love Story"	"Me!"	"We Are Never Ever Getting Back Together"	"I Don't Wanna Live Forever"	"Cardigan"	"Everything Has Changed"	"Exile"	"22"	"The 1"
Drake	"What's My Name?"	"Work"	"Hotline Bling"	"Hold On, We're Going Home"	"Emotionless"	"No Guidance"	"Jimmy Cooks"	"Greece"	"Take Care"	"Fake Love"
Michael Jackson	"One Day in Your Life"	"Say Say Say"	"Rockin' Robin"	"Dirty Diana"	"Got to Be There"	"Human Nature"	"Ben"	"Ain't No Sunshine"	"Will You Be There"	"Who Is It"

Nine out of ten
No. 1	No. 2	No. 3	No. 4	No. 5	No. 6	No. 7	No. 8	No. 9	No. 10
Bon Jovi (Note: Bon Jovi band member Jon Bon Jovi did peak at No. 1 as part of the charity single Everybody Hurts in 2010.)	UB40; Celine Dion; Cher	Pet Shop Boys	Frankie Laine; The Rolling Stones; David Bowie; Iron Maiden; Kanye West	George Michael; R. Kelly; Coldplay	Status Quo; The Saturdays (Note: Frankie Bridge and Rochelle Humes of The Saturdays did peak at No. 6 as two-eighths of S Club 8.); Beyoncé (Note: Beyoncé did peak at No. 6 as a quarter of Destiny's Child.); Justin Bieber	Eurythmics (Note: All nine of Eurythmics' top ten hits reached different peaks.); Dua Lipa; Calvin Harris	The Stylistics; Girls Aloud (Note: Kimberley Walsh of Girls Aloud did peak at No. 8 as a solo artist.); Justin Timberlake	The Beach Boys; Rod Stewart; Madness; Craig David	Ed Sheeran; Lady Gaga

=== Biggest selling non-number one ===
Based on purchases alone, the record is held by Oasis with their 1995 single "Wonderwall", with 1.55 million copies sold. The song spent a week at number two behind "I Believe" by Robson & Jerome. Including streaming data, the record is held by "Mr. Brightside" by The Killers, which peaked at number 10 in 2004 and has been certified 9× Platinum for 5.4 million units.

Based on purchases, the biggest selling single to peak at number three is New Order's "Blue Monday", which has sold over a million copies. However, it garnered its total sales via two further remixes of the track, meaning its one million sales are attributed over all three releases. The biggest selling individual release to peak at number three is Ed Sheeran's "The A Team", which has sold over 1,067,000 copies since its 2011 release.

The biggest selling single never to make the top 5 is "Chasing Cars" by Snow Patrol, which peaked at number 6 and has sold more copies than "The A Team".

The biggest selling single not to reach the top 10 is "A Thousand Years" by Christina Perri with physical sales of 844,000 and a peak of number 11. With streams included, this title goes to "Do I Wanna Know?" by Arctic Monkeys, which peaked at number 11 in 2013 and has been certified 6× Platinum for 3.6 million units.

=== Simultaneously charting songs and singles ===
- "Unchained Melody" is the only song to have four versions by different artists charting in the Top 20 at the same time (Al Hibbler, Les Baxter, Jimmy Young and Liberace in June 1955).
- "Hallelujah" charted in the same week in December 2008 with three artists (Alexandra Burke at No. 1, Jeff Buckley at No. 2, Leonard Cohen at No. 36). It is also the second time in UK single chart where different versions hold the top two spots (the first being Singing the Blues).
- "Santa Claus is Coming to Town" charted for 3 different artists (The Jackson 5 at No. 30, Bruce Springsteen at No. 48 and Michael Buble at No. 82) on 28 December 2018.
- "White Christmas" also charted by three different artists (Bing Crosby at No. 31, Gwen Stefani at No. 62 and Glee Cast featuring Chris Colfer & Darren Criss at No. 98) on 28 December 2018.

=== Most hits without reaching... ===
- Most Number 2 hits without reaching Number 1: Sash! (5)
- Most Top 5 hits without reaching Number 1: Janet Jackson (9)
- Most Top 75 hits without reaching Number 1: Glee Cast (100)
- Most Top 75 hits without reaching the Top 10: The 1975 (27) (Note: This record was previously held by D-Block Europe, who surrendered their claim to The 1975 by reaching No.6 with "Overseas", their 31st hit, with their run of 30 hits failing to reach the top 10, an all-time record.)
- Most Top 40 hits without reaching the Top 10: Super Furry Animals (19)
- Most Number 11 hits without reaching the Top 10: Lethal Bizzle (3)
- Most Top 75 hits without reaching the Top 40: Gorky's Zygotic Mynci (8)

=== Most top 10 hits without a number 1 single ===
Total	Artist
18	Bon Jovi
17	Janet Jackson
15	Nat King Cole
14	Depeche Mode
14	The Who
14	50 Cent
13	Texas
12	Guns N' Roses
11	Billy Fury
11	Tina Turner

== Other records ==
=== First to... ===
- On July 6, 2014, Ariana Grande's "Problem" made chart history upon its debut as the first song to top the charts in the UK Official Singles Chart based on both sales and streaming, with a combined 'chart sales' figure of 113,000.
- On 8 January 2016, Justin Bieber became the first artist in history to hold the top three positions in the UK Official Singles Chart. He achieved this feat as "Love Yourself", "Sorry" and "What Do You Mean?" charted at positions one, two and three simultaneously.
- The first song to have four separate spells at number one with the same artist line-up was "Three Lions" by Baddiel & Skinner and The Lightning Seeds. The original 1996 version had two one-week stints in 1996, while the 1998 re-work had one three-week spell at the top. The 2018 FIFA World Cup propelled it to a record-breaking fourth outing at the top in July 2018.
- The first week when all the Top 10 singles (actually Top 12) stayed at the previous week's positions (other than Xmas or other "frozen" charts) occurred on 7 June 2019. This is only true of the combined sales and streaming chart; in the sales only chart, only the top two positions were static and there was a new entry.
- On 29 July 2021, Little Mix became the first girl group in history to spend 100 weeks inside the UK singles chart Top 10.
- On 27 December 2019, Ellie Goulding reached no.1 on the singles chart with "River", only available on Amazon Music the first to reach this position only available on one platform.

=== Downloads ===
Downloads grew steadily in popularity after first being integrated into the chart in 2005. In early September 2004, the UK Official Download Chart was launched, and a new live recording of Westlife's "Flying Without Wings" was the first number-one. The first number one to chart without ever receiving a UK physical release was Coldplay's "Viva la Vida" in June 2008. As of 2012, very few songs are given a physical release, and almost the entire chart is released solely on digital download and, since 2014, streaming.

On 22 June 2008, both songs in the top two were there on downloads alone:

1. "Viva la Vida" by Coldplay
2. "Closer" by Ne-Yo

On 31 August 2008, the top three were download-only at the time:

1. "I Kissed a Girl" by Katy Perry
2. "Pjanoo" by Eric Prydz
3. "Disturbia" by Rihanna

On 1 March 2009, the top four were all download-only:

1. "My Life Would Suck Without You" by Kelly Clarkson
2. "Love Story" by Taylor Swift
3. "Poker Face" by Lady Gaga
4. "Dead and Gone" by T.I. (feat. Justin Timberlake)

By 13 February 2010, the whole top 9 consisted of download-only songs:

1. "Fireflies" by Owl City
2. "Under Pressure (Ice Ice Baby)" by Jedward (feat. Vanilla Ice)
3. "If We Ever Meet Again" by Timbaland (feat. Katy Perry)
4. "Don't Stop Believin'" by Glee Cast
5. "Empire State of Mind (Part II) Broken Down" by Alicia Keys
6. "Replay" by Iyaz
7. "Starstrukk" by 3OH!3 (feat. Katy Perry)
8. "One Shot" by JLS
9. "Don't Stop Believin'" by Journey

== See also ==
- List of songs which have spent the most weeks on the UK Singles Chart
- List of artists who reached number one on the UK Singles Chart
