= ÷ (album) =

Studio album by Ed Sheeran
- Released: 3 March 2017
- Recorded: Early 2015 – Late 2016
- Genres: Pop; folk-pop; hip-hop; R&B
- Length: 46:14
- Labels: Asylum; Atlantic
- Producers: Sheeran; Benny Blanco; Steve Mac; Johnny McDaid; Will Hicks; Labrinth; Mike Elizondo

Ed Sheeran chronology
5 (2015)	÷ (2017)	No.6 Collaborations Project (2019)

Singles from ÷
- 1. "Castle on the Hill" Released: 6 January 2017; 2. "Shape of You" Released: 6 January 2017; 3. "Galway Girl" Released: 17 March 2017; 4. "Perfect" Released: 26 September 2017; 5. "Happier" Released: 27 April 2018

÷ (Divide) is the third studio album by English singer-songwriter Ed Sheeran. It was released on 3 March 2017 through Asylum Records and Atlantic Records. "Castle on the Hill" and "Shape of You" were released as the album's lead singles on 6 January 2017. The album won the Grammy Award for Best Pop Vocal Album at the 60th Annual Grammy Awards. As of March 2024, the deluxe version of the album is the second most streamed album of all time on Spotify.

The album was number one in the United Kingdom, selling 672,000 copies in its first week, making it the fastest-selling album by a male solo artist there and the highest opening behind Adele's 25 and Oasis' Be Here Now. ÷ topped the charts in over 25 territories across the globe, including the United States, Canada, and Australia. In April 2018, the International Federation of the Phonographic Industry named ÷ the best-selling album worldwide of the year. In October 2019, it was ranked the fifth best-selling album of the 21st century in the UK.

All the tracks on the album reached the top 20 of the UK Singles Chart in the week of the album's release. The dominance of its tracks on the UK chart led to calls for change on how the singles chart is compiled, and the Official Charts Company then introduced new rules limiting tracks eligible for entry in the top 100 to three per artist, as well as adjusting the streams-to-sales ratio for older songs. His fourth single from ÷, "Perfect", reached number one in the US, Australia and the UK, where it became the Christmas number one of 2017.

To promote the album, Sheeran embarked on a worldwide concert tour, entitled the ÷ Tour. Comprising 260 shows, it started on 16 March 2017 and ended on 26 August 2019 with the last of four homecoming gigs in Ipswich, Suffolk. By August 2019, it had become the biggest, most attended, and highest-grossing tour of all time.

== Background ==
On 13 December 2015, Sheeran announced a self-imposed hiatus from social media, commenting that he found himself "seeing the world through a screen and not my eyes." He further ensured that some of this time would be spent creating his third album, which he considered "the best thing I have made thus far." Exactly one year after this announcement, on 13 December 2016, Sheeran's various social media platforms posted pictures of a blank blue square to state his imminent return to music. On 1 January 2017, Sheeran officially ended his hiatus by announcing that "new music" would be released on 6 January. On 12 January 2017, Sheeran revealed the tracklist and the release date for the album with its pre-order.

== Release ==
÷ was released on 3 March 2017 through Asylum Records.

Worldwide, on the day of its release, the tracks of the album achieved a total of 56.73 million streams on Spotify in a single day, breaking the previous record of 29 million for Starboy by the Weeknd in November 2016. In total, all tracks by Sheeran were streamed 68.7 million times that day, with the single "Shape of You" receiving 10.12 million streams, both also breaking previous records on Spotify. Both records were broken by Drake's More Life 16 days later. By its second day of release, the videos of songs from the album had achieved a cumulative one billion views on YouTube, including figures from "Shape of You" and "Castle on the Hill" released earlier.

== Singles ==
"Castle on the Hill" and "Shape of You", the album's lead singles, were issued on 6 January 2017. Sheeran teased the tracks on social media during the week leading up to their release, posting instrumental extracts and each song's opening lyric.

"Galway Girl" was announced as the third single via Sheeran's Twitter on 17 March 2017. It was added to BBC Radio 2's playlist the following day (18 March 2017).

On 21 August 2017, Billboard announced that "Perfect" would be the fourth single from the album. The song was sent to top 40 radio on 26 September 2017.

"Happier" was released on 27 April 2018 as the album's fifth and final single in Italy.

=== Promotional singles ===
"How Would You Feel (Paean)" was released on 17 February 2017 as a promotional single with its pre-order.

An extended live acoustic version of "Eraser" debuted on the SB.TV YouTube channel on 28 February 2017; marking the 10th anniversary of SB.TV's involvement with YouTube, and the seventh anniversary of Sheeran's YouTube involvement with SB.TV.

"Supermarket Flowers" was released as a promotional single following Sheeran's performance at the 2018 Brit Awards.

== Critical reception ==
Professional ratings
Aggregate scores
Source	Rating
AnyDecentMusic?	5.6/10
Metacritic	62/100
Review scores
Source	Rating
AllMusic	3.5/5 stars
The Arts Desk	4/5 stars
Consequence of Sound	C−
The Daily Telegraph	4/5 stars
Entertainment Weekly	B−
The Guardian	2/5 stars
The Independent	4/5 stars
NME	4/5 stars
Pitchfork	2.8/10
Rolling Stone	4/5 stars

The album has been given a Metacritic score of 62 based on 17 reviews, indicating "generally favorable reviews". Maura Johnston of Rolling Stone gave a four-star review, commenting that "Ed is still showcasing pop savvy on Divide" and going on to say that he "doubles down on the blend of hip-hop bravado and everyday-bloke songwriting that helped him break out at the turn of the decade." Roisin O'Connor of The Independent also gave the album a four-star rating, claiming "[the album] leans on little asides from Sheeran's own talent" and that it was "astonishing for its sheer ambition alone". Jordan Bassett of NME described the album as "a collection that, somehow, adheres to his perfect pop template... while also being quietly weird", and that the album is "likeable", "assured but unassuming and sometimes hard to fathom". Mark Kennedy of the Associated Press, after commenting on the album's "missteps", said that it "is certain to add listeners, subtract a few weary of his inconsistency, but definitely multiply his bank account", and ultimately called Sheeran "a special talent".

Some reviews were unfavourable; Harriet Gibsone of The Guardian gave the album a two-star rating out of five, calling it "no less calculating than his peers at the very top level of pop stardom". In a negative review of 2.8 out of 10, Laura Snapes of Pitchfork stated: "considering he [Sheeran] is among the most successful songwriters in the world, a lot of his lyrics do not even scan." In another negative review, writing for Drowned in Sound, David Hillier gave ÷ a 3/10 rating, calling it "the most anodyne and bland pop album possible."

== Commercial performance ==
=== United Kingdom ===
The album sold 232,000 physical and digital copies in the UK on its first day of release without the inclusion of streaming data, more than the sales of Sheeran's previous album x in its first week. In its three days, the album continued to increase in sales and sold over 432,000 copies, thereby topping the UK Albums Chart with just three days of availability. The album sold 63% in physical format, 31% in digital, and 6% in streaming equivalent sales. The album sold a total of 672,000 copies in the UK during its first week, making it the nation's fastest-selling album by a male artist and the third highest opening overall behind Adele's 25 (which sold 800,307 copies in its first week) and Oasis' Be Here Now (which sold 696,000 copies in its first week). In ÷'s opening week, Sheeran had his first three albums chart in the top five in the UK. Additionally, it broke the record for the most top 10 songs from a single album on the UK Singles Chart (with nine songs in the top 10 in a single week as well), surpassing a record previously held by Calvin Harris. All 16 songs from the album also entered the top 20. The album reached one million sales in the UK after just 16 days. In the first half of 2017, the album pushed UK music sales up by 11.2% compared to previous year, and it was the best-selling entertainment product of year, ahead of film releases such as Rogue One: A Star Wars Story. By July 2017, the album had sold over 2 million units in the UK—1.22 million of these from physical sales and 371,000 copies from downloads, with streaming contributing 415,000 equivalent units. It has since topped the UK Albums Chart for a total of 20 non-consecutive weeks, the longest amount of time since Adele's 21 held the summit in 2011 and 2012. ÷ was the nation's highest selling album of the year with over 2,128,000 copies sold by the end of 2017.

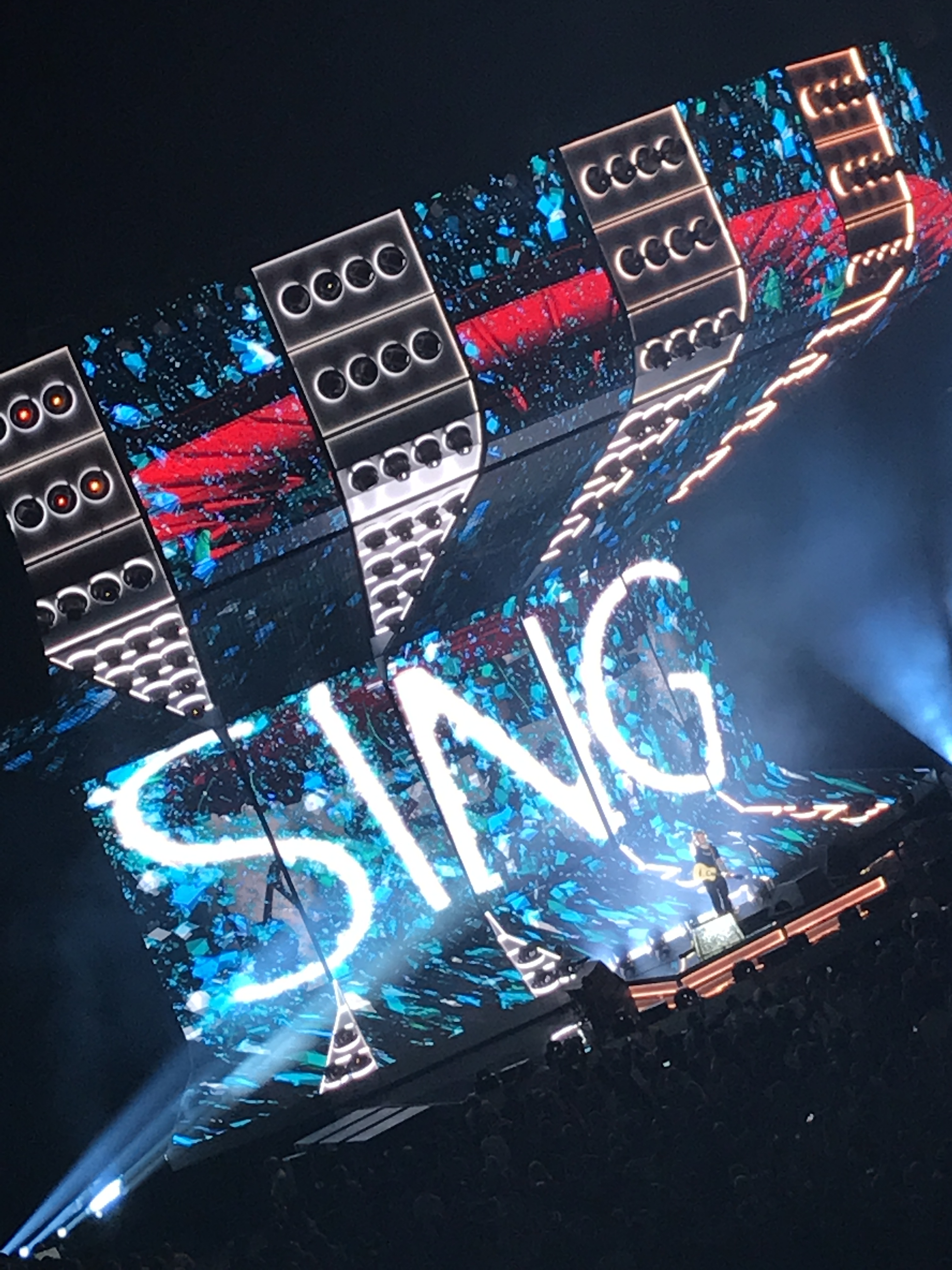
Ed Sheeran performing during his ÷ (pronounced: Divide) tour.

The large number of tracks from the album on the UK Singles Chart led to calls to reconsider how the charts are compiled. In response to the controversy and to help new artists on the chart, the Official Charts Company introduced rules limiting the number of tracks by a lead artist eligible for entry in the top 100 to three, to be introduced for charts published starting 7 July 2017. It also adjusted the streams-to-sales ratio for older tracks that had declined for three consecutive weeks or any record that had charted for ten weeks to accelerate removal of existing songs. On 9 August 2019, "Barcelona" was certified platinum by the British Phonographic Industry, despite not being released as a single.

=== United States ===
÷ debuted at number one on the US Billboard 200 with 451,000 album-equivalent units, of which 322,000 were pure album sales. The tracks collectively achieved 134.6 million streams in the United States in the album's first week of availability. Ten songs from the album also debuted on the Hot 100 the same week, joining the three songs already on the chart, including "Shape of You" in its seventh week at number one. In its second week, it stayed on top of Billboard 200 with 180,000 units (87,000 copies sold), which qualified it for a Gold certification from the RIAA on 22 March 2017. By July 2017, tracks from the album had accumulated over one billion audio streams in the US. ÷ earned 2,764,000 album-equivalent units in the US throughout 2017, finishing as the year's best-selling album in the country, and was its second highest-selling album in pure copies, with 1,102,000 copies sold, behind Taylor Swift's Reputation.

=== Other markets ===
In Ireland, ÷ opened at number one as fastest-selling album of the decade with 27,600 units (including 21,300 copies), just 2,300 units below the two-times platinum certification disc. All three of Sheeran's albums were in the top five. Furthermore, the entire top 16 of the Irish Singles Chart consisted only of songs from the album. In Australia, the album opened at number one with a double Platinum certification in its first week, selling 97,014 copies. Sheeran also achieved a record with 18 songs in the Australian top 40 in the same week—16 from the album and two from Sheeran's other albums, which were also in the top five of the albums chart. It has since held the nation's summit a total of 25 non-consecutive weeks, the ninth longest total time spent there. ÷ was Australia's highest selling album of 2017 with more than 420,000 copies sold throughout the year. He also topped the charts in the Belgian region of Flanders, Germany, Italy, the Netherlands, New Zealand, and Sweden. In all, it opened at number one in over 14 countries, including 10 European nations.

It started at number two in France, selling 40,900 copies. After five months of availability, it was certified three-times platinum there, amounting to 300,000 units (sales and streaming). As of December 2017, it exceeds 334,000 sales in France. By the end of 2017, 387,000 units (physical and downloads) had been sold in France according to Pure Charts. It was ranked second on the year-end album sales chart. It received a diamond certification disc nine months after it was released, due to selling 566,492 units (with streaming). It was ranked first on the year-end album chart (including streaming). As of April 2018, it has sold 600,000 units (including streaming) in France.

As of March 2018, the album has stayed at the top of the Danish Albums Chart for 36 non-consecutive weeks, becoming the album with most weeks at number one in Denmark (since IFPI Denmark and Nielsen started tracking sales in 1993).

=== Worldwide ===
÷ was the best selling album globally of 2017, with 6.1 million copies worldwide according to the IFPI and selling 1.3 million copies in pure sales in 2018.

== Track listing ==
Standard edition
No.	Title	Writer(s)	Producer(s)	Length
1.	"Eraser"	Ed Sheeran; Johnny McDaid	McDaid	3:47
2.	"Castle on the Hill"	Sheeran; Benny Blanco	Blanco	4:21
3.	"Dive"	Sheeran; Blanco; Julia Michaels	Blanco	3:58
4.	"Shape of You"	Sheeran; McDaid; Kandi Burruss; Kevin "She'kspere" Briggs; Steve Mac; Tameka Cottle	Mac	3:53
5.	"Perfect"	Sheeran	Sheeran; Will Hicks	4:23
6.	"Galway Girl"	Sheeran; McDaid; Foy Vance; Amy Wadge; Damian McKee; Eamon Murray; Liam Bradley; Niamh Dunne; Seán Óg Graham	Mike Elizondo	2:50
7.	"Happier"	Sheeran; Blanco; Ryan Tedder	Blanco	3:27
8.	"New Man"	Sheeran; Blanco; Ammar Malik; Jessie Ware	Blanco	3:09
9.	"Hearts Don't Break Around Here"	Sheeran; McDaid	Sheeran	4:08
10.	"What Do I Know?"	Sheeran; McDaid; Vance	Sheeran; McDaid	3:57
11.	"How Would You Feel (Paean)"	Sheeran	Sheeran	4:40
12.	"Supermarket Flowers"	Sheeran; McDaid; Blanco	Blanco; McDaid	3:41
Total length:				46:14

Deluxe edition
No.	Title	Writer(s)	Producer(s)	Length
13.	"Barcelona"	Sheeran; McDaid; Blanco; Vance; Wadge	Sheeran; Blanco	3:11
14.	"Bibia Be Ye Ye"	Sheeran; Blanco; Fuse ODG; KillBeatz; Stephen Woode	Sheeran; Blanco; KillBeatz	2:56
15.	"Nancy Mulligan"	Sheeran; McDaid; Blanco; Vance; Wadge; Murray Cummings	Sheeran; Blanco	2:59
16.	"Save Myself"	Sheeran; Wadge; Labrinth	Sheeran; Labrinth	4:07
Total length:				59:27

Notes

- "Shape of You" interpolates "No Scrubs" by TLC.
- The French collector's edition includes "Shape of You", "Castle on the Hill", and "Supermarket Flowers" live at Taratata.

== Personnel ==
Credits adapted from AllMusic and album's liner notes.

- Ed Sheeran – lead vocals (all tracks), guitars (all but 4, 8, 12, 14 & 16), backing vocals (1–6, 9, 10, 13–16), mandolin (2), bass (3, 9, 10), percussion (4, 10, 14), acoustic guitar (5) cello (7), drums (9, 14), body percussion (9), beatbox (13)
- Benny Blanco – programming and keyboards (tracks 2, 3, 7, 8, 12–15), backing vocals (7, 15)
- Leo Abrahams – guitar (track 1)
- Laurie Anderson – viola (tracks 5, 7)
- Thomas Bartlett – keyboard and piano (tracks 2, 3, 7)
- Fenella Barton – violin II (tracks 5, 7)
- Leon Bosch – double bass (tracks 5, 7)
- Liam Bradley – piano (tracks 6, 7, 15), backing vocals (6, 7, 15), percussion (15)
- Karl Brazil – drums (track 11)
- Aoife Burke – cello (track 16)
- Archie Carter – backing vocals (track 15)
- Nick Cartledge – flute and piccolo (tracks 5, 7)
- Meghan Cassidy – viola (tracks 5, 7)
- Eric Clapton (as Angelo Mysterioso) – guitar solo (track 3)
- Travis Cole – backing vocals (track 4)
- Nick Cooper – cello (tracks 5, 7), orchestra leader (16)
- Billy Cummings – backing vocals (track 15)
- Murray Cummings – backing vocals (track 15)
- Mandhira De Saram – violin I (tracks 5, 7)
- Matthew Denton – violin I (tracks 5, 7)
- James Dickenson – violin II (tracks 5, 7)
- Alison Dods – violin II (tracks 5, 7)
- Niamh Dunne – fiddle and backing vocals (tracks 6, 7, 15), percussion (15)
- Mike Elizondo – drum programming, synthesizer bass, piano, and keyboards (track 6)
- DJ Final – scratches (track 8)
- Brian Finnegan – tin whistle (tracks 6, 15)
- Nicole Fischer – viola (track 16)
- Geo Gabriel – backing vocals (track 4)
- Oscar Golding – bass (tracks 1, 11)
- Sean Graham – accordion and backing vocals (tracks 6, 7, 15), percussion (15)
- Laurence Love Greed – piano (tracks 9, 11)
- Charys Green – clarinet (tracks 5, 7)
- Peter Gregson – cello (track 11), conductor (5, 7)
- Ian Hendrickson-Smith – saxophone (track 13)
- Wayne Hernandez – backing vocals (track 4)
- Will Hicks – electric guitar, percussion, and programming (track 5)
- Martyn Jackson – violin I (tracks 5, 7)
- Katherine Jenkinson – cello (tracks 5, 7)
- Magnus Johnston – violin I (tracks 5, 7)
- Marije Johnston – violin I (tracks 5, 7)
- Simon Hewitt Jones – violin I (tracks 5, 7)
- Patrick Kiernan – violin I (tracks 5, 7)
- Labrinth – piano (track 16)
- Trevor Lawrence Jr. – drums (track 6)
- Chris Laws – drums (track 4)
- Jay Lewis – drums (track 5)
- Tim Lowe – cello (tracks 5, 7)
- Steve Mac – keyboards (track 4)
- Ammar Malik – backing vocals (track 8)
- Kirsty Mangan – violin II (tracks 5, 7)
- John Mayer – electric guitar solo (track 11)
- Joe McCann – backing vocals (track 15)
- Johnny McDaid – guitar (track 1), acoustic guitar (6, 15), keyboards (1), piano (7, 12), programming (1), backing vocals (12, 15)
- Damian McKee – accordion and backing vocals (tracks 6, 7, 15), percussion (15)
- Lisanne Melchoir – viola (track 16)
- Jeremy Morris – violin II (tracks 5, 7)
- Eamon Murray – bodhrán and backing vocals (tracks 6, 7, 15), percussion (15)
- Feilimidh Nunan – violin (track 16)
- ÒT – guitar (track 14)
- Pino Palladino – bass (tracks 2, 3, 5, 8, 13)
- Phillip Peterson – strings (track 7)
- Dierdre Reddy – violin (track 16)
- Jan Regulski – violin I (tracks 5, 7)
- Rachel Roberts – viola (tracks 5, 7)
- Mikey Rowe – keyboards (track 1)
- Joe Rubel – drum programming (tracks 9, 10), additional guitars (9, 11), synths (9)
- Ben Russell – double bass (tracks 5, 7)
- Kotono Sato – viola (tracks 5, 7)
- Nico Segal – trumpet (track 13)
- Matthew Sheeran – string arrangements (tracks 5, 7, 16)
- Hilary Skewes – coordination (tracks 5, 7)
- Francis Farewell Starlite – backing vocals (track 8)
- Aura Stone – double bass (track 16)
- Yue Tang – cello (track 16)
- Leo Taylor – drums (tracks 2, 3)
- Ryan Tedder – piano (track 7)
- John Tilley – piano and Hammond organ (track 5)
- Foy Vance – backing vocals (tracks 6, 15)
- Anita Vedres – violin (track 16)
- Amy Wadge – backing vocals (track 15)
- Jessie Ware – backing vocals (tracks 3, 7, 8)
- Deborah Widdup – violin II (tracks 5, 7)

=== Production ===
- Executive producers – Ed Sheeran and Benny Blanco
- Produced by Ed Sheeran (tracks 2, 5, 9–11, 13–16), Benny Blanco (2, 3, 7, 8, 12–15), Steve Mac (4), Johnny McDaid (1, 10, 12), Will Hicks (5), Mike Elizondo (6), and Labrinth (16)
- Co-produced by Ed Sheeran (tracks 1, 4, 12)
- Additional production by Benny Blanco (track 5)
- Original production by KillBeatz (track 14)
- Engineered by Joe Rubel (all tracks), Graham Archer (1, 6, 11), Chris Sclafani (2, 3, 5, 7, 8, 12–15), Dann Pursey (4), Chris Laws (4), and Adam Hawkins (6)
- Assistant engineers – Duncan Fuller (tracks 1, 6, 10, 11), Matt Jones (3, 5, 7), George Oulton (3, 5, 7), Paul Pritchard (5), Jack Fairbrother (5), Johnny Solway (5), Brent Arrowood (6), Archie Carter (9–11), Robert Sellens (9–11)
- Mixed by Mark "Spike" Stent at The Mixsuite UK & LA
- Assisted by Geoff Swan and Michael Freeman
- Mastered by Stuart Hawkes at Metropolis Mastering, London
- Design and art direction by Jonny Costello and Charlotte Audery at Adultartclubco.uk
- Cover art photography by David Rowan
- Illustrations by Kasiq Jungwoo
- Photography by @gregwilliamsphotography
- Original cover painting by Ed Sheeran with thanks to Damian and Science for use of their machine

== Charts ==
=== Weekly charts ===
Weekly chart performance for ÷
Chart (2017–2024)	Peak position
Australian Albums (ARIA)	1
Austrian Albums (Ö3 Austria)	1
Belgian Albums (Ultratop Flanders)	1
Belgian Albums (Ultratop Wallonia)	2
Brazilian Albums (Billboard Brasil)	1
Canadian Albums (Billboard)	1
Croatian International Albums (HDU)	1
Czech Albums (ČNS IFPI)	1
Danish Albums (Hitlisten)	1
Dutch Albums (Album Top 100)	1
Finnish Albums (Suomen virallinen lista)	1
French Albums (SNEP)	1
German Albums (Offizielle Top 100)	1
Greek Albums (IFPI)	2
Hungarian Albums (MAHASZ)	1
Irish Albums (IRMA)	1
Italian Albums (FIMI)	1
Japanese Albums (Oricon)	5
Latvian Albums (LaIPA)	5
Mexican Albums (AMPROFON)	2
New Zealand Albums (RMNZ)	1
Nigerian Albums (TurnTable)	80
Norwegian Albums (VG-lista)	1
Polish Albums (ZPAV)	1
Portuguese Albums (AFP)	1
Scottish Albums (Official Charts)	1
Slovak Albums (ČNS IFPI)	1
South Korean Albums (Gaon)	28
Spanish Albums (Promusicae)	1
Swedish Albums (Sverigetopplistan)	1
Swiss Albums (Schweizer Hitparade)	1
UK Albums (Official Charts)	1
US Billboard 200	1

=== Year-end charts ===
2017 year-end chart performance for ÷
Chart (2017)	Position
Australian Albums (ARIA)	1
Austrian Albums (Ö3 Austria)	2
Belgian Albums (Ultratop Flanders)	1
Belgian Albums (Ultratop Wallonia)	4
Canadian Albums (Billboard)	1
Czech Albums (ČNS IFPI)	2
Danish Albums (Hitlisten)	1
Dutch Albums (MegaCharts)	1
French Albums (SNEP)	1
German Albums (Offizielle Top 100)	2
Icelandic Albums (Tónlistinn)	4
Italian Albums (FIMI)	1
Japanese Albums (Oricon)	40
Mexican Albums (AMPROFON)	20
New Zealand Albums (RMNZ)	1
Norwegian Albums (VG-lista)	1
Polish Albums (ZPAV)	2
Spanish Albums (PROMUSICAE)	7
South Korean International Albums (Gaon)	8
Swedish Albums (Sverigetopplistan)	1
Swiss Albums (Schweizer Hitparade)	1
UK Albums (OCC)	1
US Billboard 200	4

2018 year-end chart performance for ÷
Chart (2018)	Position
Australian Albums (ARIA)	2
Austrian Albums (Ö3 Austria)	3
Belgian Albums (Ultratop Flanders)	2
Belgian Albums (Ultratop Wallonia)	14
Canadian Albums (Billboard)	2
Czech Albums (ČNS IFPI)	1
Danish Albums (Hitlisten)	2
Dutch Albums (MegaCharts)	2
French Albums (SNEP)	11
German Albums (Offizielle Top 100)	5
Icelandic Albums (Tónlistinn)	10
Irish Albums (IRMA)	3
Italian Albums (FIMI)	10
Japanese Albums (Billboard Japan)	46
Mexican Albums (AMPROFON)	65
New Zealand Albums (RMNZ)	1
Polish Albums (ZPAV)	19
Spanish Albums (PROMUSICAE)	16
South Korean International Albums (Gaon)	12
Swedish Albums (Sverigetopplistan)	4
Swiss Albums (Schweizer Hitparade)	2
UK Albums (OCC)	3
US Billboard 200	5

2019 year-end chart performance for ÷
Chart (2019)	Position
Australian Albums (ARIA)	11
Austrian Albums (Ö3 Austria)	29
Belgian Albums (Ultratop Flanders)	12
Belgian Albums (Ultratop Wallonia)	67
Canadian Albums (Billboard)	13
Czech Albums (ČNS IFPI)	10
Danish Albums (Hitlisten)	8
Dutch Albums (Album Top 100)	9
German Albums (Offizielle Top 100)	58
Icelandic Albums (Tónlistinn)	14
Irish Albums (IRMA)	10
Italian Albums (FIMI)	44
New Zealand Albums (RMNZ)	6
Polish Albums (ZPAV)	90
Spanish Albums (PROMUSICAE)	51
Swedish Albums (Sverigetopplistan)	21
Swiss Albums (Schweizer Hitparade)	14
UK Albums (OCC)	11
US Billboard 200	31

2020 year-end chart performance for ÷
Chart (2020)	Position
Australian Albums (ARIA)	16
Austrian Albums (Ö3 Austria)	39
Belgian Albums (Ultratop Flanders)	25
Belgian Albums (Ultratop Wallonia)	140
Canadian Albums (Billboard)	29
Czech Albums (ČNS IFPI)	7
Danish Albums (Hitlisten)	14
Dutch Albums (Album Top 100)	21
Icelandic Albums (Tónlistinn)	41
Irish Albums (IRMA)	16
Italian Albums (FIMI)	70
New Zealand Albums (RMNZ)	14
Swedish Albums (Sverigetopplistan)	26
Swiss Albums (Schweizer Hitparade)	40
UK Albums (OCC)	13
US Billboard 200	65

2021 year-end chart performance for ÷
Chart (2021)	Position
Australian Albums (ARIA)	13
Austrian Albums (Ö3 Austria)	13
Belgian Albums (Ultratop Flanders)	21
Belgian Albums (Ultratop Wallonia)	105
Canadian Albums (Billboard)	25
Danish Albums (Hitlisten)	8
Dutch Albums (Album Top 100)	17
German Albums (Offizielle Top 100)	94
Icelandic Albums (Tónlistinn)	43
Irish Albums (IRMA)	13
Italian Albums (FIMI)	53
New Zealand Albums (RMNZ)	16
Norwegian Albums (VG-lista)	25
Swedish Albums (Sverigetopplistan)	32
Swiss Albums (Schweizer Hitparade)	28
UK Albums (OCC)	7
US Billboard 200	71

2022 year-end chart performance for ÷
Chart (2022)	Position
Australian Albums (ARIA)	22
Austrian Albums (Ö3 Austria)	13
Belgian Albums (Ultratop Flanders)	26
Belgian Albums (Ultratop Wallonia)	105
Canadian Albums (Billboard)	31
Danish Albums (Hitlisten)	11
Dutch Albums (Album Top 100)	20
German Albums (Offizielle Top 100)	66
Icelandic Albums (Tónlistinn)	79
Italian Albums (FIMI)	83
New Zealand Albums (RMNZ)	14
Swedish Albums (Sverigetopplistan)	52
Swiss Albums (Schweizer Hitparade)	34
UK Albums (OCC)	12
US Billboard 200	95

2023 year-end chart performance for ÷
Chart (2023)	Position
Australian Albums (ARIA)	23
Austrian Albums (Ö3 Austria)	28
Belgian Albums (Ultratop Flanders)	36
Belgian Albums (Ultratop Wallonia)	117
Canadian Albums (Billboard)	39
Danish Albums (Hitlisten)	22
Dutch Albums (Album Top 100)	30
New Zealand Albums (RMNZ)	14
Swedish Albums (Sverigetopplistan)	73
Swiss Albums (Schweizer Hitparade)	37
UK Albums (OCC)	26
US Billboard 200	106

2024 year-end chart performance of ÷
Chart (2024)	Position
Australian Albums (ARIA)	43
Austrian Albums (Ö3 Austria)	52
Belgian Albums (Ultratop Flanders)	45
Belgian Albums (Ultratop Wallonia)	176
Danish Albums (Hitlisten)	34
Dutch Albums (Album Top 100)	40
German Albums (Offizielle Top 100)	73
Swiss Albums (Schweizer Hitparade)	44
UK Albums (OCC)	37
US Billboard 200	188

2025 year-end chart performance for ÷
Chart (2025)	Position
Australian Albums (ARIA)	48
Austrian Albums (Ö3 Austria)	52
Belgian Albums (Ultratop Flanders)	36
Belgian Albums (Ultratop Wallonia)	146
Dutch Albums (Album Top 100)	35
German Albums (Offizielle Top 100)	51
Japanese Hot Albums (Billboard Japan)	66
Swedish Albums (Sverigetopplistan)	80
Swiss Albums (Schweizer Hitparade)	27
UK Albums (OCC)	39

=== Decade-end charts ===
Decade-end chart performance for ÷
Chart (2010–2019)	Position
Australian Albums (ARIA)	4
Dutch Albums (Album Top 100)	3
German Albums (Offizielle Top 100)	11
UK Albums (OCC)	4
US Billboard 200	3

== Certifications and sales ==
Certifications and sales for ÷
Region	Certification	Certified units/sales
Argentina (CAPIF) Physical sales	Gold	10,000^{^}
Argentina (CAPIF) Digital sales	Platinum	20,000^{^}
Australia (ARIA)	11× Platinum	770,000^{‡}
Austria (IFPI Austria)	7× Platinum	105,000^{‡}
Belgium (BRMA)	3× Platinum	90,000^{‡}
Canada (Music Canada)	Diamond	800,000^{‡}
Chile	Gold	
Denmark (IFPI Danmark)	14× Platinum	280,000^{‡}
France (SNEP)	2× Diamond	1,000,000^{‡}
Germany (BVMI)	5× Platinum	1,000,000^{‡}
Hungary (MAHASZ)	3× Platinum	6,000^{^}
Iceland (Tónlistinn)	—	7,546
Italy (FIMI)	7× Platinum	350,000^{‡}
Japan (RIAJ)	Gold	100,000^{^}
Mexico (AMPROFON)	2× Platinum	120,000^{‡}
Netherlands (NVPI)	4× Platinum	160,000^{‡}
New Zealand (RMNZ)	18× Platinum	270,000^{‡}
Poland (ZPAV)	Diamond	100,000^{‡}
Portugal (AFP)	Platinum	15,000^{^}
Singapore (RIAS)	7× Platinum	70,000^{*}
Spain (Promusicae)	Platinum	40,000^{‡}
Sweden (GLF)	2× Platinum	80,000^{‡}
Switzerland (IFPI Switzerland)	2× Platinum	40,000^{‡}
United Kingdom (BPI)	15× Platinum	4,500,000^{‡}
United States (RIAA)	5× Platinum	5,000,000^{‡}
^{*} Sales figures based on certification alone.^{^} Shipments figures based on certification alone.^{‡} Sales+streaming figures based on certification alone.

== See also ==
- List of best-selling albums in Australia
- List of best-selling albums in New Zealand
- List of best-selling albums of the 2010s in the United Kingdom
- List of Billboard 200 number-one albums of 2017
- List of number-one albums of 2017 (Australia)
- List of number-one albums of 2017 (Belgium)
- List of number-one albums of 2017 (Ireland)
- List of number-one albums of 2017 (Canada)
- List of UK Albums Chart number ones of 2017
- List of number-one albums from the 2010s (New Zealand)
