= What Do I Know? =

Song by Ed Sheeran

from the album ÷
- Released: 3 March 2017
- Recorded: 2016
- Genre: Folk-pop; R&B
- Length: 3:57
- Label: Asylum; Atlantic
- Songwriters: Ed Sheeran; Foy Vance; Johnny McDaid
- Producers: Ed Sheeran; Johnny McDaid

"What Do I Know?" is a song by English singer-songwriter Ed Sheeran. It was included on his third studio album ÷ (2017), serving as the tenth track. After the album's release it charted at number 9 on the UK Singles Chart.

Sheeran performed the song live with the cast of People Just Do Nothing on the telethon for Comic Relief 2017.

== Background ==
The song is the tenth track on Sheeran's third studio album ÷, which was released in March 2017, three years on from his previous release x. In an interview with People magazine, Sheeran said that the song was "basically written on the spot" in a meeting with one of his record label executives. He said, "That was a weird song because that song was written trying to peacock in front of my label head. He'd come down to my house for the day, and I'd started writing that song, and in my head I was like 'I want to show him how fast I can write a song'. So that song came from just trying to write a song really quickly, to show him that I could write a song".

In an interview with Zane Lowe, Sheeran said that the song is a "knee-jerk reaction" to things that had happened in 2016: "I'm not a hugely outwardly political person, and I don't want to be. I'm a singer, and I know if like I had a political opinion, people would be like, 'Shut up mate! Sing your song.' ... My whole mantra in life is always like 'love is everything'. I love love, I love when people are happy. So my whole point of this song is basically not to say 'fuck everyone, everything is going to shit' It's just like love can change everything, love can change the world in the moment, but I don't know anything, what do I know, don't quote me. Basically being able to say anything "political" I want to say, but then being like [shrug]."

Sheeran also said that he intended to end concerts on the North American leg of his ÷ Tour with "What Do I Know?", saying 'I really want to close shows with that one because I feel like walking away from a gig having "love can change the world" in your head is a good thing'.

== Comic Relief version ==
Sheeran recorded a version of the song for Comic Relief 2017 with Kurupt FM from the BBC TV series People Just Do Nothing. He also performed the song live on the telethon after his appeal video was shown.

== Charts ==
=== Weekly charts ===
| Chart (2017) | Peak position |
|---|---|
| Australia (ARIA) | 24 |
| Austria (Ö3 Austria Top 40) | 27 |
| Canada Hot 100 (Billboard) | 26 |
| Czech Republic Singles Digital (ČNS IFPI) | 15 |
| Denmark (Tracklisten) | 25 |
| France (SNEP) | 98 |
| Germany (GfK) | 35 |
| Hungary (Stream Top 40) | 19 |
| Ireland (IRMA) | 8 |
| Italy (FIMI) | 38 |
| Netherlands (Single Top 100) | 16 |
| Norway (VG-lista) | 31 |
| New Zealand (Recorded Music NZ) | 14 |
| Philippines (Philippine Hot 100) | 54 |
| Scotland Singles (OCC) | 33 |
| Slovakia Singles Digital (ČNS IFPI) | 15 |
| Sweden (Sverigetopplistan) | 25 |
| UK Singles (OCC) | 9 |
| US Billboard Hot 100 | 83 |

=== Year-end charts ===
| Chart (2017) | Position |
|---|---|
| UK Singles (Official Charts Company) | 69 |

| Chart (2018) | Position |
|---|---|
| Iceland (Plötutíóindi) | 66 |

== Certifications ==
Certifications for What Do I Know
| Region | Certification | Certified units/sales |
|---|---|---|
| Australia (ARIA) | 2× Platinum | 140,000^{‡} |
| Austria (IFPI Austria) | Gold | 15,000^{‡} |
| Canada (Music Canada) | 2× Platinum | 160,000^{‡} |
| Denmark (IFPI Danmark) | Gold | 45,000^{‡} |
| Italy (FIMI) | Gold | 25,000^{‡} |
| New Zealand (RMNZ) | 2× Platinum | 60,000^{‡} |
| Poland (ZPAV) | Platinum | 50,000^{‡} |
| United Kingdom (BPI) | Platinum | 600,000^{‡} |
| United States (RIAA) | Gold | 500,000^{‡} |
^{‡} Sales+streaming figures based on certification alone.
