= Supermarket Flowers =

Promotional single by Ed Sheeran

from the album ÷
- Released: 3 March 2017
- Recorded: 2016
- Length: 3:41
- Label: Asylum; Atlantic
- Songwriters: Ed Sheeran; Johnny McDaid
- Producers: Benny Blanco; Johnny McDaid

"Supermarket Flowers" is a song by English singer-songwriter Ed Sheeran and the final track on the standard edition of his third studio album ÷ (2017). After the album's release it charted at number 8 on the UK Singles Chart. It was released as a promotional single following Sheeran's performance at the 2018 Brit Awards.

== Background ==
The song is the 12th and final track on the standard version of Ed Sheeran's third studio album ÷ (Divide).

In an interview with MTV, Sheeran revealed that the song is about his late maternal grandmother. He said "She was in a hospital near my house where I was making the album so I saw her quite a lot while making the album and she passed away while I was in the studio. So that's my first reaction for anything that happens to me, good or bad, pick up a guitar." He also said that the song is supposed to "really make you cry". Sheeran had not intended to put the song in the album 'Divide' as it was simply a personal tribute to his grandmother. His father first suggested that he should play the song at her funeral, which he did, and his grandfather then urged that it should be included in the album after hearing it at the funeral. Sheeran said: "My grandfather just turned to me [at the funeral], he was like you have to put that out, that has to go on the record. It's such a good memory, that's why it's ended up on there."

== Charts ==
=== Weekly charts ===
Chart (2017–18)	Peak position
Australia (ARIA)	19
Austria (Ö3 Austria Top 40)	39
Canada Hot 100 (Billboard)	31
Czech Republic Singles Digital (ČNS IFPI)	25
Denmark (Tracklisten)	26
France (SNEP)	109
Germany (GfK)	29
Hungary (Stream Top 40)	40
Ireland (IRMA)	9
Italy (FIMI)	43
Netherlands (Single Top 100)	20
Philippines (Philippine Hot 100)	29
Scotland Singles (OCC)	12
Sweden (Sverigetopplistan)	25
UK Singles (OCC)	8
US Billboard Hot 100	75

=== Year-end charts ===
Chart (2017)	Position
UK Singles (Official Charts Company)	90

== Certifications ==
Region	Certification	Certified units/sales
Australia (ARIA)	4× Platinum	280,000^{‡}
Austria (IFPI Austria)	Platinum	30,000^{‡}
Canada (Music Canada)	3× Platinum	240,000^{‡}
Denmark (IFPI Danmark)	Platinum	90,000^{‡}
France (SNEP)	Gold	100,000^{‡}
Germany (BVMI)	Gold	200,000^{‡}
Italy (FIMI)	Gold	25,000^{‡}
New Zealand (RMNZ)	3× Platinum	90,000^{‡}
Poland (ZPAV)	Platinum	50,000^{‡}
Portugal (AFP)	Gold	5,000^{‡}
Spain (PROMUSICAE)	Gold	30,000^{‡}
United Kingdom (BPI)	3× Platinum	1,800,000^{‡}
United States (RIAA)	Platinum	1,000,000^{‡}
^{‡} Sales+streaming figures based on certification alone.
