= Eraser (Ed Sheeran song) =

Song by Ed Sheeran

from the album ÷
- Released: 3 March 2017
- Recorded: 2016
- Genre: Acoustic hip hop
- Length: 3:47
- Label: Asylum; Atlantic
- Songwriters: Ed Sheeran; Johnny McDaid
- Producers: Ed Sheeran; Johnny McDaid

"Eraser" is a song by English singer-songwriter Ed Sheeran from his third studio album ÷ (2017). Serving as the opening track of the album, it was written and produced by Sheeran and Johnny McDaid. After the album's release, it charted at number 14 on the UK Singles Chart.

== Background ==
The song was written by Sheeran with Johnny McDaid in the treehouse he built in his garden. They first recorded a riff on his guitar on the McDaid's iPhone before he went to bed, while McDaid stayed up all night to produce the beat for the riff. Speaking about the song to Zane Lowe on his Beats 1 show, Sheeran said: "The original first line of it was what is now the bridge ['Welcome to the new show'] and I was just sitting there and I was like this doesn't hit anywhere here ... And then so I just said: 'Johnny can you bugger off for a bit and let me just see what I can do' and just write loads of bars, and that came like within five seconds, and 'Oh wow! something is happening.' Johnny came back half an hour later and we recorded the song."

Sheeran also said: "I wanted to casually move into a stadium zone without making twelve 'Castle on the Hill's. I wanted to make songs that sounded big but weren't necessarily just euphoric stadium anthems."

The song reveals personal details about his life, and Sheeran said it is an opportunity to vent on things that had happened in his life in the previous five years that he had not talked about. It mentions the envy felt by friends and family on his success. Sheeran said: "Friends and family are meant to be the ones who are there for you, 90% of the time they are, but every now and then there is the odd comment that just like sinks your soul." On money, he said: "Money is the weirdest thing ... That's kinda the only thing that changed in my life drastically, but the way people treat you because of it, and they think you are going to change because of it, and they treat you differently, inevitably you change your opinion to them because they are treating you differently. It's a really weird thing. I try to stay exactly the same as I was before." The line "but I hope that Damien's proud" is a reference to Damien Rice, regarded by Sheeran as an influence on his music. Rice is also referenced in another song of Sheeran's, "You Need Me, I Don't Need You". The line "Relationships, and hearts you fixed, they break as well" is likely to reference him getting Jesy Nelson and former tour support Jake Roche engaged only for them to split 4 months before the album was released.

== Critical reception ==
Mark Kennedy of the Chicago Tribune called the track "terrific...akin to Eminem's 'Lose Yourself'". Jim Farber with Entertainment Weekly said the song started the album on "dangerous ground", but concluded that it summarized the artist "in a nutshell: self-aware, self-deprecating and likable". Jordan Bassett of NME said "Sheeran manages to moan about superstardom...without sounding like a right bloody berk", while adding that the artist has "less than wicked flow". In a less favourable review, music critic Laura Snapes said that in the song "his words fit together with the elegance of Stickle Bricks", while adding it "feels like the only true reflection of his psyche" on the album. Roisin O'Connor of The Independent said the track "feels like an unusual way to open the album—Sheeran has never been a strong rapper (he admits as much in 'Take It Back' on x)—but is redeemed by the chorus". While acknowledging rap's influence on artists of Sheeran's generation, Jeremy Gordon of Spin magazine said that Sheeran's raps "seem like a costume, on account of his deeply uncool whiteness", but continued that Sheeran "belts a big, heartfelt chorus that could've been written for the Goo Goo Dolls—a switch that immediately sounds more natural".

== Charts and certifications ==
=== Weekly charts ===
Chart (2017)	Peak position
Australia (ARIA)	31
Austria (Ö3 Austria Top 40)	35
Canada Hot 100 (Billboard)	36
Czech Republic Singles Digital (ČNS IFPI)	20
Denmark (Tracklisten)	20
France (SNEP)	75
Germany (GfK)	21
Hungary (Stream Top 40)	21
Ireland (IRMA)	15
Italy (FIMI)	35
Netherlands (Single Top 100)	19
Slovakia Singles Digital (ČNS IFPI)	21
Sweden (Sverigetopplistan)	31
UK Singles (Official Charts)	14
US Billboard Hot 100	90

=== Certifications ===
Region	Certification	Certified units/sales
Canada (Music Canada)	Platinum	80,000^{‡}
Denmark (IFPI Danmark)	Gold	45,000^{‡}
Italy (FIMI)	Gold	25,000^{‡}
New Zealand (RMNZ)	Platinum	30,000^{‡}
Poland (ZPAV)	Gold	25,000^{‡}
United Kingdom (BPI)	Platinum	600,000^{‡}
United States (RIAA)	Gold	500,000^{‡}
^{‡} Sales+streaming figures based on certification alone.
