= Barcelona (Ed Sheeran song) =

Song by Ed Sheeran

from the album ÷
- Released: 3 March 2017
- Recorded: 2016
- Genre: Latin pop
- Length: 3:11
- Label: Asylum; Atlantic
- Songwriters: Amy Wadge; Benny Blanco; Ed Sheeran; Foy Vance; Johnny McDaid
- Producers: Benny Blanco; Ed Sheeran

"Barcelona" is a song by English singer-songwriter Ed Sheeran. It was included on the deluxe edition of his third studio album ÷ (2017) and is the thirteenth track. It was written by Amy Wadge, Benny Blanco, Ed Sheeran, Foy Vance and Johnny McDaid and it was produced by Sheeran and Blanco. After the album's release, it charted at number 12 on the UK Singles Chart.

== Background ==
"Barcelona" was written by Sheeran with Foy Vance, who is signed to his Gingerbread Records, for his love of the Spanish city of Barcelona, which is located in the autonomous community of Catalonia.

The lyrics contained some of the cod-Spanish song as Sheeran told the Sun Newspaper: "It doesn't make a lot of sense. It's just a Spanish words that I know put together". "Foy Vance, a guy that's on my label, we wrote the song together". "There's one line where I say 'Siempre Vivre La Barcelona' which is actually Latin I think, but it just sounded cool. It means long live Barcelona".

== Critical reception ==
Celeb Mix writer Ellie Doe-Demosse stated: "Barcelona definitely helped us get out of the sadness we were feeling in the last song, and all we wanted to do after we cried was get up and dance because of how much a tune this song is. We love how Ed incorporated Spanish culture in his album, because as he's said in a couple interviews, he wrote the songs on Divide in countless parts of the world while he was on his hiatus. We love how he chose to go about writing the album and where to write each song, because that's what makes his album that much more special."

== Charts and certifications ==
=== Weekly charts ===
Chart (2017)	Peak position
Australia (ARIA)	36
Austria (Ö3 Austria Top 40)	43
Canada Hot 100 (Billboard)	45
Denmark (Tracklisten)	33
France (SNEP)	129
Germany (GfK)	43
Ireland (IRMA)	10
Netherlands (Single Top 100)	21
New Zealand (Recorded Music NZ)	25
Scotland Singles (OCC)	32
Spain (PROMUSICAE)	32
Sweden (Sverigetopplistan)	48
UK Singles (OCC)	12
US Billboard Hot 100	96

=== Year-end charts ===
Chart (2017)	Position
UK Singles (Official Charts Company)	98

=== Certifications ===
Region	Certification	Certified units/sales
Canada (Music Canada)	Platinum	80,000^{‡}
New Zealand (RMNZ)	Platinum	30,000^{‡}
Poland (ZPAV)	Gold	25,000^{‡}
Spain (PROMUSICAE)	Gold	30,000^{‡}
United Kingdom (BPI)	Platinum	600,000^{‡}
United States (RIAA)	Gold	500,000^{‡}
^{‡} Sales+streaming figures based on certification alone.
