= Nancy Mulligan =

Song by Ed Sheeran

from the album ÷
- Released: 3 March 2017
- Recorded: 2016
- Genre: Irish folk
- Length: 2:59
- Label: Asylum; Atlantic
- Songwriters: Amy Wadge; Benny Blanco; Ed Sheeran; Foy Vance; Johnny McDaid; Murray Cummings
- Producers: Benny Blanco; Ed Sheeran

"Nancy Mulligan" is a song by English singer-songwriter Ed Sheeran. It was included on the deluxe edition of his third studio album ÷ (2017) and is the fifteenth track. After the album's release it charted at number 13 on the UK Singles Chart. Sheeran recorded the song together with Beoga.

== Background ==
"Nancy Mulligan" is one of the most personal songs on the album, telling the story of how his grandparents, William Sheeran, a Protestant from Belfast, Northern Ireland and Anne "Nancy" Mulligan, a Catholic from the Republic of Ireland, met, fell in love during the Second World War and got married at the Wexford border. Sheeran said: "They got engaged and no one turned up at their wedding. He stole all the gold teeth in his dental surgery and melted them down into a wedding ring, and they wore borrowed clothes to get married, and just basically have this kind of Romeo and Juliet romance, which is like the most romantic thing. So I thought I'd write a song about it and make it a jig [reel]."

In an interview with the Irish Times, talking about the song's Irish roots, Sheeran said "I don't think enough people use Irish folk in pop music... Hopefully if these songs are successful, more people will do a bit more like it."

== Notable performances and covers ==
Sheeran performed the song, backed on stage by Beoga, during his headline performance at the Glastonbury Festival 2017.

== Charts and certifications ==
=== Weekly charts ===
Chart (2017)	Peak position
Australia (ARIA)	37
Austria (Ö3 Austria Top 40)	42
Canada Hot 100 (Billboard)	51
Czech Republic Singles Digital (ČNS IFPI)	27
Denmark (Tracklisten)	37
France (SNEP)	127
Germany (GfK)	43
Hungary (Stream Top 40)	28
Ireland (IRMA)	3
Italy (FIMI)	59
Netherlands (Single Top 100)	26
New Zealand (Recorded Music NZ)	27
Scotland Singles (OCC)	21
Slovakia Singles Digital (ČNS IFPI)	28
Sweden (Sverigetopplistan)	50
UK Singles (OCC)	13
US Bubbling Under Hot 100 (Billboard)	1

=== Certifications ===
Region	Certification	Certified units/sales
Austria (IFPI Austria)	Gold	15,000^{‡}
Canada (Music Canada)	Platinum	80,000^{‡}
Denmark (IFPI Danmark)	Gold	45,000^{‡}
Italy (FIMI)	Gold	25,000^{‡}
New Zealand (RMNZ)	Platinum	30,000^{‡}
Poland (ZPAV)	Gold	25,000^{‡}
United Kingdom (BPI)	Platinum	600,000^{‡}
United States (RIAA)	Gold	500,000^{‡}
^{‡} Sales+streaming figures based on certification alone.
