= How Would You Feel (Paean) =

Promotional single by Ed Sheeran

from the album ÷
- Released: 17 February 2017
- Recorded: 2016
- Genre: Blue-eyed soul
- Length: 4:40
- Label: Asylum; Atlantic
- Songwriter: Ed Sheeran
- Producer: Ed Sheeran

"How Would You Feel (Paean)" is a song by English singer-songwriter Ed Sheeran. It was released on 17 February 2017 as the first promotional single from his third studio album ÷ (2017) as well as the eleventh track. Upon release it charted at number 2 on the UK Singles Chart. It has also made the top 10 in six other countries.

== Background and release ==
"How Would You Feel (Paean)" was written by Sheeran while his girlfriend, Cherry Seaborn was on her way to the airport to fly back home after a visit. He wrote the song, recorded on his iPhone and sent it to her in an email. He said that it was written basically just to say to her, "It's really good, I feel happy, how do you feel?" Sheeran admitted that the song nearly didn't make it onto the album, however, because he had forgotten that he had written it. In an interview on On Air with Ryan Seacrest, he said, "I finished the album and I was going through notes and I said to my girlfriend, 'What's your favourite song on the album?' She said, 'You've forgotten it existed and I have it in my e-mail because I'm the only one you sent it to.' So she picked it out from like, a year-and-a-half ago and I ended up recording it."

A guitar solo is played by John Mayer in the song. According to Sheeran, he had initially played the guitar solo himself, but on listening to his recording, thought that it sounded like a "poor man's John Mayer". As he knew Mayer, he contacted him to play the solo.

Sheeran released "How Would You Feel (Paean)" to mark his 26th birthday, although he insisted that it was not an official single.

== Critical reception ==
Cécile Howard of The Edge gave the song 3 stars out of 5 and said, "Not introducing anything new, 'How Would You Feel (Paean)' brings back exactly what the fans' wanted and expected with somewhat of a superficial aftertaste." Taylor Weatherby of Billboard described the song as the one with the "best guitar solo" of the album, writing that Sheeran "pulls out a John Mayer-esque solo about two-thirds of the way through this song that really establishes him as a master of his craft".

== Charts ==
=== Weekly charts ===
Chart (2017)	Peak position
Australia (ARIA)	2
Austria (Ö3 Austria Top 40)	25
Belgium (Ultratip Bubbling Under Flanders)	5
Belgium (Ultratip Bubbling Under Wallonia)	21
Canada Hot 100 (Billboard)	19
Czech Republic Singles Digital (ČNS IFPI)	22
Denmark (Tracklisten)	18
Euro Digital Songs (Billboard)	4
France (SNEP)	84
Germany (GfK)	27
Hungary (Stream Top 40)	35
Ireland (IRMA)	5
Italy (FIMI)	32
Netherlands (Dutch Top 40)	31
Netherlands (Single Top 100)	10
New Zealand (Recorded Music NZ)	6
Norway (VG-lista)	30
Philippines (Philippine Hot 100)	21
Portugal (AFP)	22
Scotland Singles (OCC)	1
Slovakia Singles Digital (ČNS IFPI)	21
Spain (PROMUSICAE)	17
Sweden (Sverigetopplistan)	30
Switzerland (Schweizer Hitparade)	18
UK Singles (OCC)	2
US Billboard Hot 100	41

=== Year-end charts ===
Chart (2017)	Position
UK Singles (Official Charts Company)	85

== Certifications ==
Region	Certification	Certified units/sales
Australia (ARIA)	2× Platinum	140,000^{‡}
Canada (Music Canada)	2× Platinum	160,000^{‡}
Denmark (IFPI Danmark)	Platinum	90,000^{‡}
Italy (FIMI)	Gold	25,000^{‡}
New Zealand (RMNZ)	2× Platinum	60,000^{‡}
Poland (ZPAV)	Platinum	50,000^{‡}
Portugal (AFP)	Gold	5,000^{‡}
United Kingdom (BPI)	Platinum	600,000^{‡}
United States (RIAA)	Gold	500,000^{‡}
^{‡} Sales+streaming figures based on certification alone.

== See also ==
- List of Scottish number-one singles of 2017
- List of UK Singles Downloads Chart number ones of the 2010s
