= Happier (Ed Sheeran song) =

Single by Ed Sheeran

from the album ÷
- Released: 27 April 2018
- Recorded: 2016
- Genre: Pop
- Length: 3:27
- Label: Asylum; Atlantic
- Songwriters: Ryan Tedder; Ed Sheeran; Benny Blanco
- Producer: Benny Blanco

Ed Sheeran singles chronology
""Perfect Symphony" version" (2017)	"Happier" (2018)	"Amo Soltanto Te / This Is The Only Time" (2019)

Music video
- "Happier" on YouTube

"Happier" is a song by English singer-songwriter Ed Sheeran. The song was written by Sheeran along with Ryan Tedder and Benny Blanco. It was included on his third studio album, ÷ (2017). After the album's release, it charted at number 6 on the UK Singles Chart. It was released in Italy on 27 April 2018 as the fourth (fifth overall) and the final single from the album.

== Composition ==
According to Sheeran, the theme of the song is about looking back at an early relationship and, despite being initially angry and bitter at the breakup, later coming to realise that his first love was happier with someone else. He said: "I remember the first girl I was with, that the first and most of the second album was about, that I was with from school. And I remember the guy she was with, meeting him one day and being like, he is so much suited to her than I ever was. Seeing them together they were happy together, we never looked like that, we were never that couple, we were never that happy. So it was having a kind of epiphany moment, and writing a song that was basically that."

"Happier" was written in the key of C major with a tempo of 90 beats per minute. The song was composed in common time (4/4 time).

== Critical reception ==
Taylor Weatherby of Billboard described it as the "most heartbreaking track" and "perhaps one of the prettiest songs" on the album. She noted the track's melodic similarity to Sam Smith's 2014 songs "Stay with Me" and "Like I Can".

== Music video ==
The official video for "Happier" was released on Ed Sheeran's YouTube account on 27 April 2018. It was directed by Emil Nava, and features a puppet caricature of Sheeran from the music video of his single "Sing" sad about the other puppet his balloon girlfriend with another puppet and ends with the balloon girl flying away.

== Formats and track listings ==
Digital download - Acoustic
No.	Title	Length
1.	"Happier" (Acoustic)	3:26

Digital download - Tiësto's AFTR:HRS remix
No.	Title	Length
1.	"Happier" (Tiësto's AFTR:HRS remix)	3:36

Digital download - Cazzette remix
No.	Title	Length
1.	"Happier" (Cazzette remix)	3:27

Digital download - Kasbo remix
No.	Title	Length
1.	"Happier" (Kasbo remix)	4:16

CD single
No.	Title	Length
1.	"Happier"	3:27
2.	"Happier" (acoustic)	3:26

== Charts ==
=== Weekly charts ===
Chart (2017–18)	Peak position
Australia (ARIA)	16
Austria (Ö3 Austria Top 40)	20
Belgium (Ultratop 50 Flanders)	12
Belgium (Ultratop 50 Wallonia)	4
Brazil International Pop Songs (Crowley Charts)	9
Canada Hot 100 (Billboard)	22
Canada AC (Billboard)	27
Canada Hot AC (Billboard)	37
Croatia (HRT)	12
Czech Republic Airplay (ČNS IFPI)	10
Czech Republic Singles Digital (ČNS IFPI)	10
Denmark (Tracklisten)	11
France (SNEP)	73
Germany (GfK)	16
Hungary (Rádiós Top 40)	13
Hungary (Stream Top 40)	20
Ireland (IRMA)	5
Italy (FIMI)	31
Netherlands (Dutch Top 40)	7
Netherlands (Single Top 100)	11
Norway (VG-lista)	22
Philippines (BillboardPH Hot 100)	19
Poland Airplay (ZPAV)	4
Slovakia Airplay (ČNS IFPI)	4
Slovakia Singles Digital (ČNS IFPI)	11
Slovenia (SloTop50)	8
Spain (Promusicae)	43
Sweden (Sverigetopplistan)	9
Switzerland (Schweizer Hitparade)	22
UK Singles (OCC)	6
US Billboard Hot 100	59

=== Year-end charts ===
Chart (2017)	Position
Australia (ARIA)	99
Denmark (Tracklisten)	79
Sweden (Sverigetopplistan)	58
UK Singles (Official Charts Company)	68

Chart (2018)	Position
Australia (ARIA)	75
Belgium (Ultratop Flanders)	35
Belgium (Ultratop Wallonia)	11
Denmark (Tracklisten)	63
Hungary (Rádiós Top 40)	57
Netherlands (Dutch Top 40)	28
Portugal (AFP)	187
Slovenia (SloTop50)	30
Sweden (Sverigetopplistan)	81
Switzerland (Schweizer Hitparade)	98

== Certifications ==
Region	Certification	Certified units/sales
Australia (ARIA)	6× Platinum	420,000^{‡}
Austria (IFPI Austria)	2× Platinum	60,000^{‡}
Belgium (BRMA)	Platinum	40,000^{‡}
Canada (Music Canada)	7× Platinum	560,000^{‡}
Denmark (IFPI Danmark)	3× Platinum	270,000^{‡}
France (SNEP)	Diamond	333,333^{‡}
Germany (BVMI)	Platinum	400,000^{‡}
Italy (FIMI)	Platinum	50,000^{‡}
New Zealand (RMNZ)	5× Platinum	150,000^{‡}
Poland (ZPAV)	4× Platinum	200,000^{‡}
Portugal (AFP)	Platinum	10,000^{‡}
Spain (Promusicae)	2× Platinum	120,000^{‡}
Sweden (GLF)	Platinum	40,000^{‡}
Switzerland (IFPI Switzerland)	Platinum	20,000^{‡}
United Kingdom (BPI)	3× Platinum	1,800,000^{‡}
United States (RIAA)	2× Platinum	2,000,000^{‡}
^{‡} Sales+streaming figures based on certification alone.

== Release history ==
Country	Date	Format	Version	Label	Ref.
Australia	27 April 2018	Contemporary hit radio	Original	Warner	
Italy	27 April 2018	Contemporary hit radio	Original	Warner	
United Kingdom	27 April 2018	Contemporary hit radio	Original	Warner	
Various	25 May 2018	Digital download	Acoustic	Asylum	
Various	1 June 2018	Digital download	Tiësto remix	Asylum	
Various	8 June 2018	Digital download	Cazzette remix	Asylum	
Various	27 July 2018	Digital download	Kasbo remix	Asylum	
Germany	6 July 2018	CD single	Original	Warner	
