= John Stocks =

John Stocks may refer to:

- John Ellerton Stocks (1822–1854), English botanist
- John Leofric Stocks (1882–1937), British philosopher
- John Stocks (priest), English archdeacon of Leicester
- John Stocks (politician), former executive director of the National Education Association

== See also ==
- John Stock (disambiguation)
