= Francis Stocks =

English cricketer

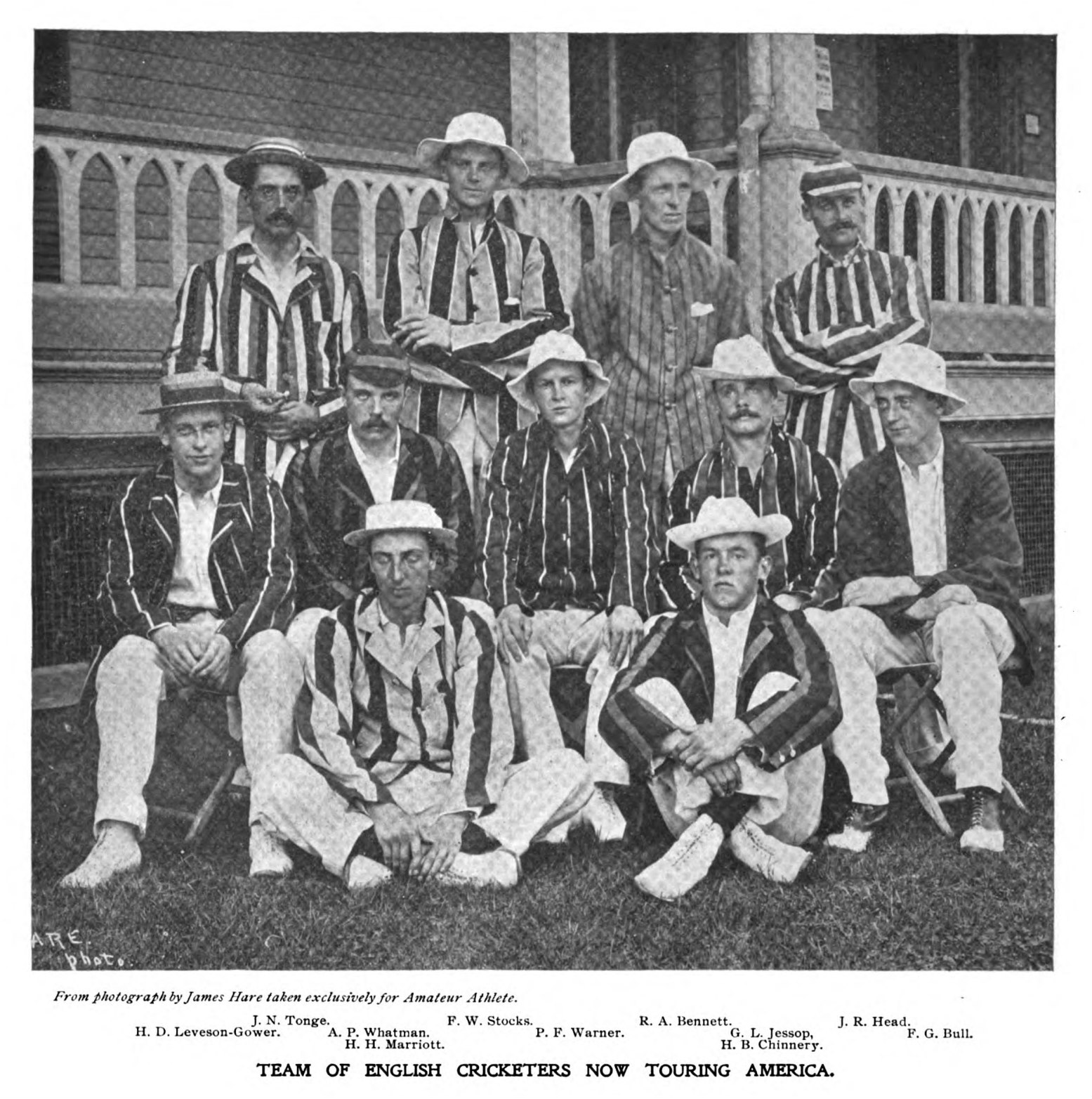
Stocks, second from left in back row, on North American tour in 1897.

Francis Wilfrid Stocks (10 December 1873 – 21 May 1929) was an English cricketer active from 1894 to 1903 who played for Leicestershire. He was born in Market Harborough and died in Framlingham. He appeared in 63 first-class matches as a lefthanded batsman who bowled left arm medium pace. He scored 834 runs with a highest score of 58 and took 208 wickets with a best performance of eight for 22.

Stocks was a son of John Stocks who at that time was vicar of Market Harborough. He was educated at Lancing College, Denstone College and New College, Oxford. He became a schoolteacher and for thirteen years was an assistant master and house-master at Felsted School; then he was headmaster of Framlingham College 1913–1929.
