= Castle on the Hill =

2017 single by Ed Sheeran

Single by Ed Sheeran

from the album ÷
- Written: 2015
- Released: 6 January 2017
- Recorded: 2015
- Genre: Folk-pop; pop; rock
- Length: 4:21
- Label: Asylum; Atlantic
- Songwriters: Benny Blanco; Ed Sheeran
- Producers: Benny Blanco; Ed Sheeran

Ed Sheeran singles chronology
"Lay It All on Me" (2015)	"Castle on the Hill" / "Shape of You" (2017)	"Galway Girl" (2017)

Music video
- "Castle on the Hill" on YouTube

"Castle on the Hill" is a song by English singer-songwriter Ed Sheeran. It was released on 6 January 2017 as one of the double lead singles from his third studio album ÷ (2017), along with "Shape of You". "Castle on the Hill" was written and produced by Ed Sheeran and Benny Blanco. The song refers to Framlingham Castle in Sheeran's adopted home town of Framlingham in Suffolk, and reminisces tales of his upbringing in the town. The BBC states, "the song has been described as a love letter to Suffolk."

Released on the same day as "Shape of You", "Castle on the Hill" reached number one in Iceland, Scotland and Israel. The song also reached number two in a number of countries, including the UK, Australia and Germany, while "Shape of You" debuted at number one. It was the first time in the history of the UK, Australian and German charts that an artist has taken the top two chart positions with new songs. The song debuted at number six in the US, while "Shape of You" entered at number one; this made Sheeran the first artist ever to have two songs simultaneously debut in the US top 10. "Castle on the Hill" is certified nine-times platinum in Australia, Diamond in Canada and 6-times platinum the UK, and multiplatinum in numerous other countries.

== Background ==
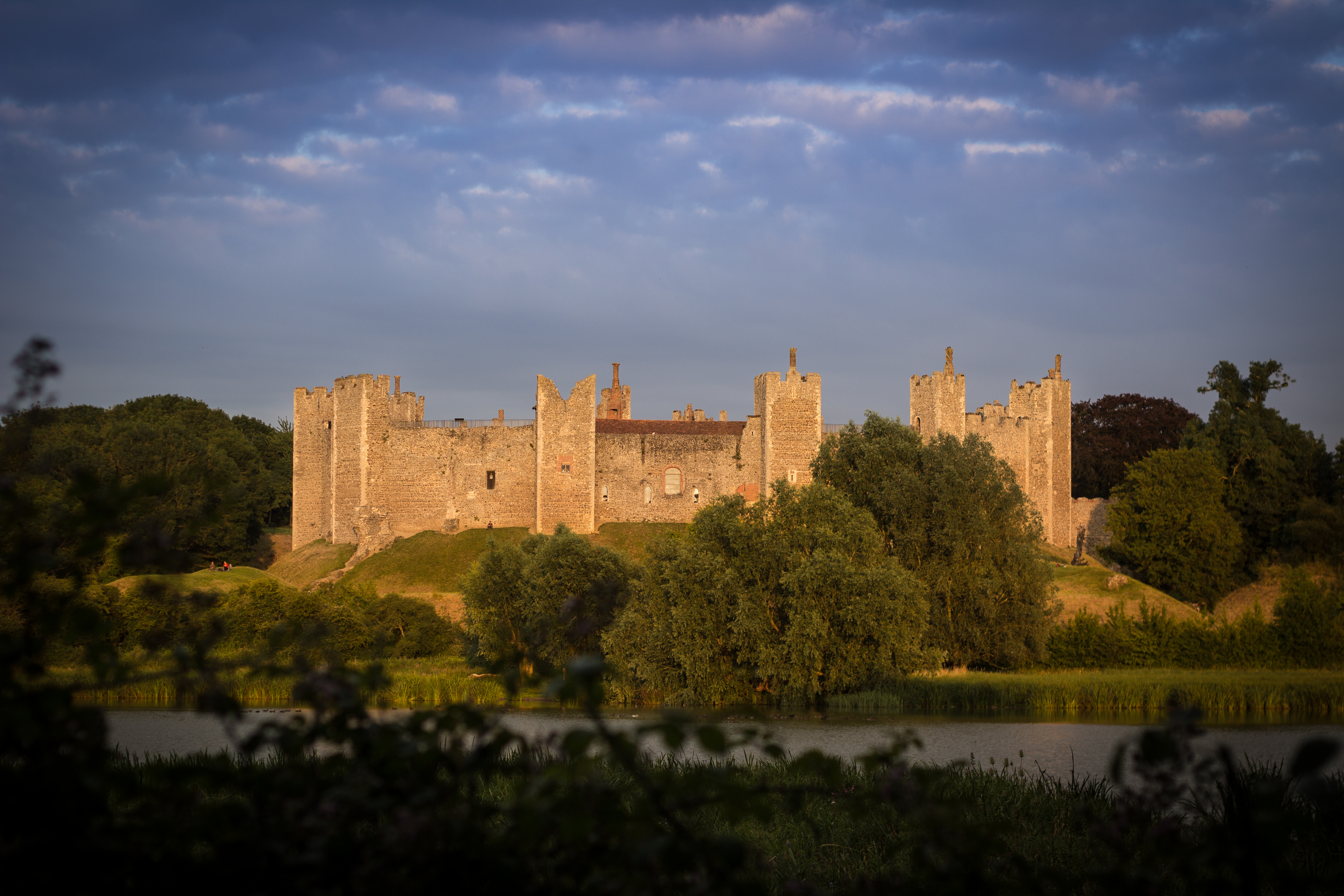
Framlingham Castle, the castle mentioned in the song.

The theme of the song is Sheeran's home town of Framlingham and the surrounding countryside. In the song, he reminisces about "smoking hand-rolled cigarettes" and getting "drunk [with] friends" as a teenager. The castle mentioned in the song is Framlingham Castle, and in January 2017, Sheeran was invited to perform at the Castle.

The song was written and recorded in 2015. Sheeran revealed that despite a similarity to the music of U2, the direct influence of the song came from "Fallen Empires" by Snow Patrol, a band he had toured with. He said: "I grew up on Snow Patrol, I didn't grow up on U2, but I know that Snow Patrol grew up on U2, so I know [where] that influence had come [from]." He also said he wanted to make a song like "The River" by Bruce Springsteen, a song with similar reflective element.

== Critical reception ==
Jon Caramanica from The New York Times said, "'Castle on the Hill' has U2 influenced nervous guitar builds and wistful, largely generic lyrics about the people who shaped him." Billboard's Taylor Weatherby wrote about the song saying, "'Castle on the Hill' has a Train like vibe with a fast-paced, yet powerful melody that builds to an epic chorus that's just as Sheeran as all of his past singles. Needless to say, Sheeran is telling the world he's back in compelling fashion." Jeremy Gordon of Spin gave the song a positive review, stating that the song "sort of sounds like late period Coldplay, big, broad stroke music for arenas and Wembley performances. There's a lyric about driving down a country road while listening to Elton John's 'Tiny Dancer,' because Ed Sheeran saw Almost Famous once." Adam Starkey from news website Metro states that it "'has echoes of Mumford & Sons with the kind of climbing drums and soaring chorus sure to win over festival crowds, recalling how far he's come from 'smoking hand-rolled cigarettes' and 'running from the law in the backfields'."

== Chart performance ==
"Castle on the Hill" debuted at number two on the UK Singles Chart on 13 January, selling 193,000 combined units in its first week. Sheeran also debuted at number one with "Shape of You", making him the only artist in UK chart history to debut in the top two positions in the same week. The song was certified silver in the first week due to selling 200,000 units. The song remained at number two in its second week, selling 100,000 units. The song spent a further three weeks at number two, and spent fourteen weeks in the top ten altogether. As of September 2017, the song has sold 1.7 million combined units in the UK, 479,000 of these are actual sales, with 119 million streams. On the Scottish Singles Chart, "Castle on the Hill" debuted at number one, ahead of "Shape of You".

The song debuted at number six on the Billboard Hot 100, selling 171,000 downloads and gaining 13 million streams in its debut week in the US. Sheeran also became the first artist to debut two songs in the top 10 in the same week in the history of the Hot 100, with "Shape of You" also debuting at number one. As of September 2017, "Castle on the Hill" has sold 821,000 downloads in the US.

== Music video ==
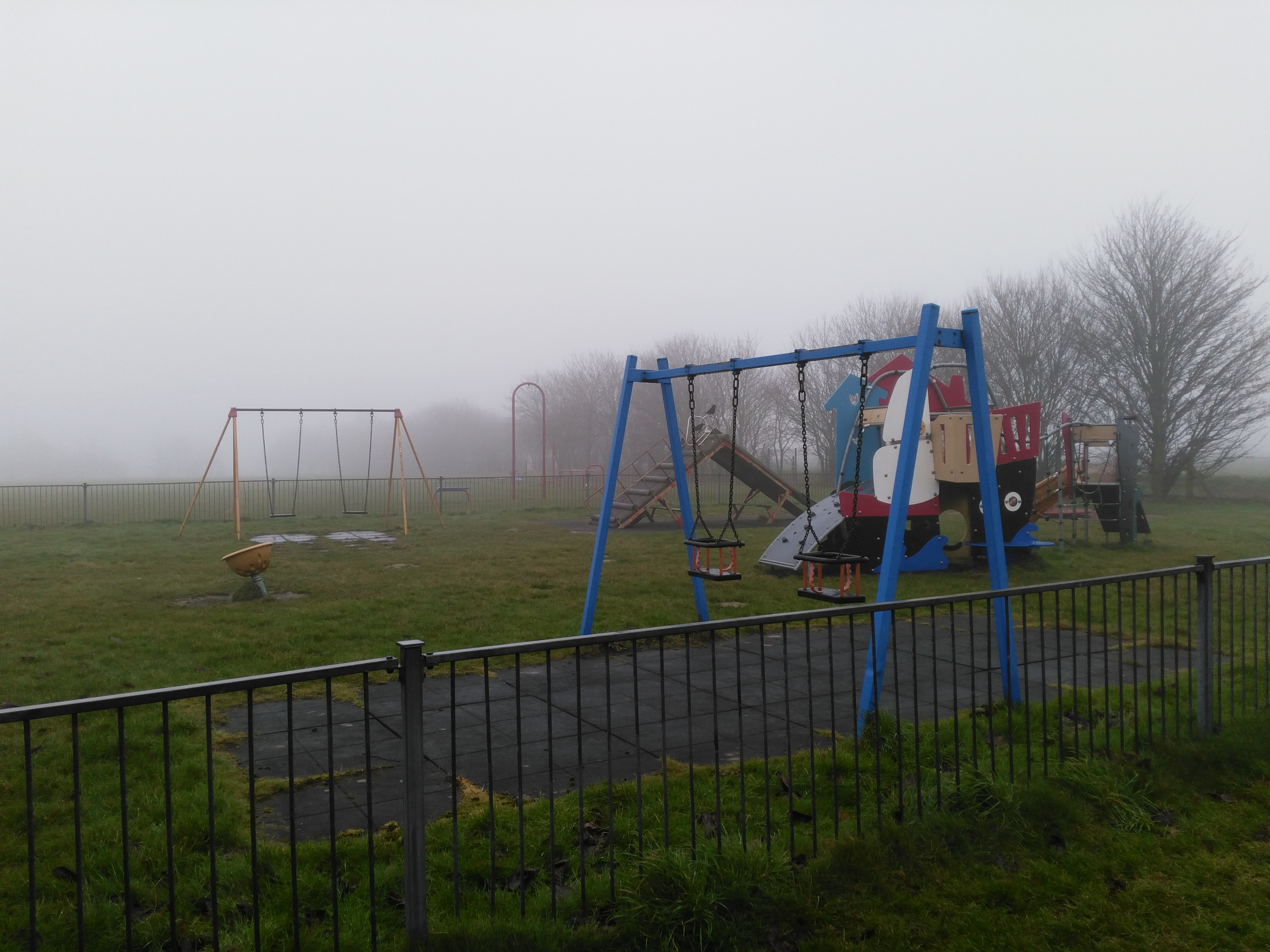
Enclosed children's play area at Eastward Ho!, Felixstowe. Location is featured in the music video.

"Castle on the Hill" was accompanied by a lyric video on 5 January 2017 with "Shape of You" upon its release. By March 2018, it had amassed over 300 million views on YouTube.

The official music video for the song was released on 23 January 2017. It was directed by George Belfield and produced by Tom Gardner, and it features a group of adolescents living their youth with parallels being made to Sheeran's own youth. The video was filmed throughout Suffolk with locations including Framlingham, Boyton marshes, Mildenhall Stadium and Felixstowe. The final shot shows Framlingham Castle. Ed Sheeran stated on The Graham Norton Show that the young man playing him in the video went to the same school as Sheeran, Thomas Mills High School.

== In popular culture ==
The song was used in trailers and several TV spots for the 2017 animated film Ferdinand.

The song is also used in the first trailer and a few TV spots for the 2019 animated film How to Train Your Dragon: The Hidden World.

== Formats and track listings ==
- Digital download
1. "Castle on the Hill" – 4:21
- Digital download – Acoustic
1. "Castle on the Hill" (Acoustic) – 3:46
- Digital download – Live at the BRITs
1. "Castle on the Hill " (Live at the BRITs) – 1:47
- German CD single
1. "Castle on the Hill" – 4:21
2. "Castle on the Hill" (Acoustic) – 3:46
- Digital download – Seeb remix
1. "Castle on the Hill" (Seeb remix) – 3:51
- Digital download – Throttle remix
1. "Castle on the Hill" (Throttle remix) – 3:40
- Digital download – NWYR remix
1. "Castle on the Hill" (NWYR remix) – 3:33

== Personnel ==
Personnel are taken from the Europe digital single liner notes.

- Ed Sheeran – lead and backing vocals, guitar, mandolin
- Pino Palladino – bass
- Leo Taylor – drums
- Benny Blanco – keyboards
- Thomas Barlett – keyboards, piano

== Charts ==
=== Weekly charts ===
Chart (2017)	Peak position
Australia (ARIA)	2
Austria (Ö3 Austria Top 40)	2
Belgium (Ultratop 50 Flanders)	2
Belgium (Ultratop 50 Wallonia)	25
Canada Hot 100 (Billboard)	2
Canada AC (Billboard)	3
Canada CHR/Top 40 (Billboard)	4
Canada Hot AC (Billboard)	6
Czech Republic Airplay (ČNS IFPI)	22
Czech Republic Singles Digital (ČNS IFPI)	2
Denmark (Tracklisten)	2
Euro Digital Songs (Billboard)	2
Finland (Suomen virallinen lista)	4
France (SNEP)	3
Germany (GfK)	2
Greece Digital Songs (Billboard)	4
Hungary (Single Top 40)	3
Hungary (Stream Top 40)	3
Iceland (RÚV)	1
Ireland (IRMA)	2
Israel (Media Forest TV Airplay)	1
Italy (FIMI)	3
Japan Hot 100 (Billboard)	39
Japan Hot Overseas (Billboard)	6
Luxembourg Digital Songs (Billboard)	2
Malaysia (RIM)	10
Mexico (Billboard Ingles Airplay)	7
Netherlands (Dutch Top 40)	4
Netherlands (Mega Top 50)	5
Netherlands (Single Top 100)	2
New Zealand (Recorded Music NZ)	2
Norway (VG-lista)	3
Philippines (Philippine Hot 100)	35
Poland Airplay (ZPAV)	29
Portugal (AFP)	3
Russia Airplay (Tophit)	92
Scottish Singles Sales (Official Charts)	1
Slovakia Airplay (ČNS IFPI)	43
Slovakia Singles Digital (ČNS IFPI)	2
Slovenia (SloTop50)	22
Spain (Promusicae)	2
Sweden (Sverigetopplistan)	2
Switzerland (Schweizer Hitparade)	2
UK Singles (Official Charts)	2
US Billboard Hot 100	6
US Adult Contemporary (Billboard)	9
US Adult Pop Airplay (Billboard)	3
US Dance Airplay (Billboard)	14
US Dance Club Songs (Billboard)	2
US Pop Airplay (Billboard)	7
US Rock & Alternative Airplay (Billboard)	40
US Anglo (Monitor Latino)	12

=== Year-end charts ===
Chart (2017)	Position
Australia (ARIA)	3
Austria (Ö3 Austria Top 40)	14
Belgium (Ultratop Flanders)	14
Brazil (Pro-Música Brasil)	195
Canada (Canadian Hot 100)	14
Denmark (Tracklisten)	5
France (SNEP)	62
Germany (Official German Charts)	23
Hungary (Single Top 40)	61
Hungary (Stream Top 40)	37
Iceland (Tónlistinn)	33
Italy (FIMI)	34
Latvia Airplay (LaIPA)	21
Netherlands (Dutch Top 40)	19
Netherlands (Single Top 100)	14
New Zealand (Recorded Music NZ)	4
Portugal (AFP)	46
Spain (Promusicae)	54
Sweden (Sverigetopplistan)	12
Switzerland (Schweizer Hitparade)	14
UK Singles (Official Charts Company)	3
US Billboard Hot 100	40
US Adult Contemporary (Billboard)	19
US Adult Top 40 (Billboard)	16
US Dance Club Songs (Billboard)	34
US Mainstream Top 40 (Billboard)	31

Chart (2018)	Position
Australia (ARIA)	90
UK Singles (Official Charts Company)	97

=== Decade-end charts ===
Chart (2010–2019)	Position
Australia (ARIA)	43
UK Singles (Official Charts Company)	11

== Certifications ==
Region	Certification	Certified units/sales
Australia (ARIA)	9× Platinum	630,000^{‡}
Austria (IFPI Austria)	2× Platinum	60,000^{‡}
Belgium (BRMA)	Platinum	20,000^{‡}
Canada (Music Canada)	Diamond	800,000^{‡}
Denmark (IFPI Danmark)	4× Platinum	360,000^{‡}
France (SNEP)	Platinum	133,333^{‡}
Germany (BVMI)	2× Platinum	800,000^{‡}
Italy (FIMI)	3× Platinum	150,000^{‡}
Netherlands (NVPI)	Platinum	40,000^{‡}
New Zealand (RMNZ)	8× Platinum	240,000^{‡}
Poland (ZPAV)	Diamond	250,000^{‡}
Portugal (AFP)	2× Platinum	20,000^{‡}
Spain (Promusicae)	2× Platinum	120,000^{‡}
Sweden (GLF)	4× Platinum	160,000^{‡}
Switzerland (IFPI Switzerland)	2× Platinum	40,000^{‡}
United Kingdom (BPI)	7× Platinum	4,200,000^{‡}
United States (RIAA)	4× Platinum	4,000,000^{‡}
Streaming
Japan (RIAJ)	Gold	50,000,000^{†}
^{‡} Sales+streaming figures based on certification alone.^{†} Streaming-only figures based on certification alone.

== Release history ==
Region	Date	Format	Version	Label	Ref.
United Kingdom	6 January 2017	Contemporary hit radio	Original	Asylum	
United States	16 January 2017	Adult album alternative	Original	Atlantic	
United Kingdom	10 February 2017	Digital download	Acoustic	Asylum	
United States	22 February 2017	Digital download	Live at the BRITs	Asylum	
Germany	24 February 2017	CD single	Original	Asylum	
United States	12 April 2017	Hot adult contemporary	Original	Atlantic	
United States	18 April 2017	Contemporary hit radio	Original	Atlantic	
Various	19 May 2017	Digital download	Seeb remix	Asylum	
Various	30 June 2017	Digital download	Throttle remix	Asylum	

== See also ==
- Lists of Scottish number-one singles of 2017
