= Framlingham =

Town in Suffolk, England

Coordinates: 52.22207°N 1.34342°E

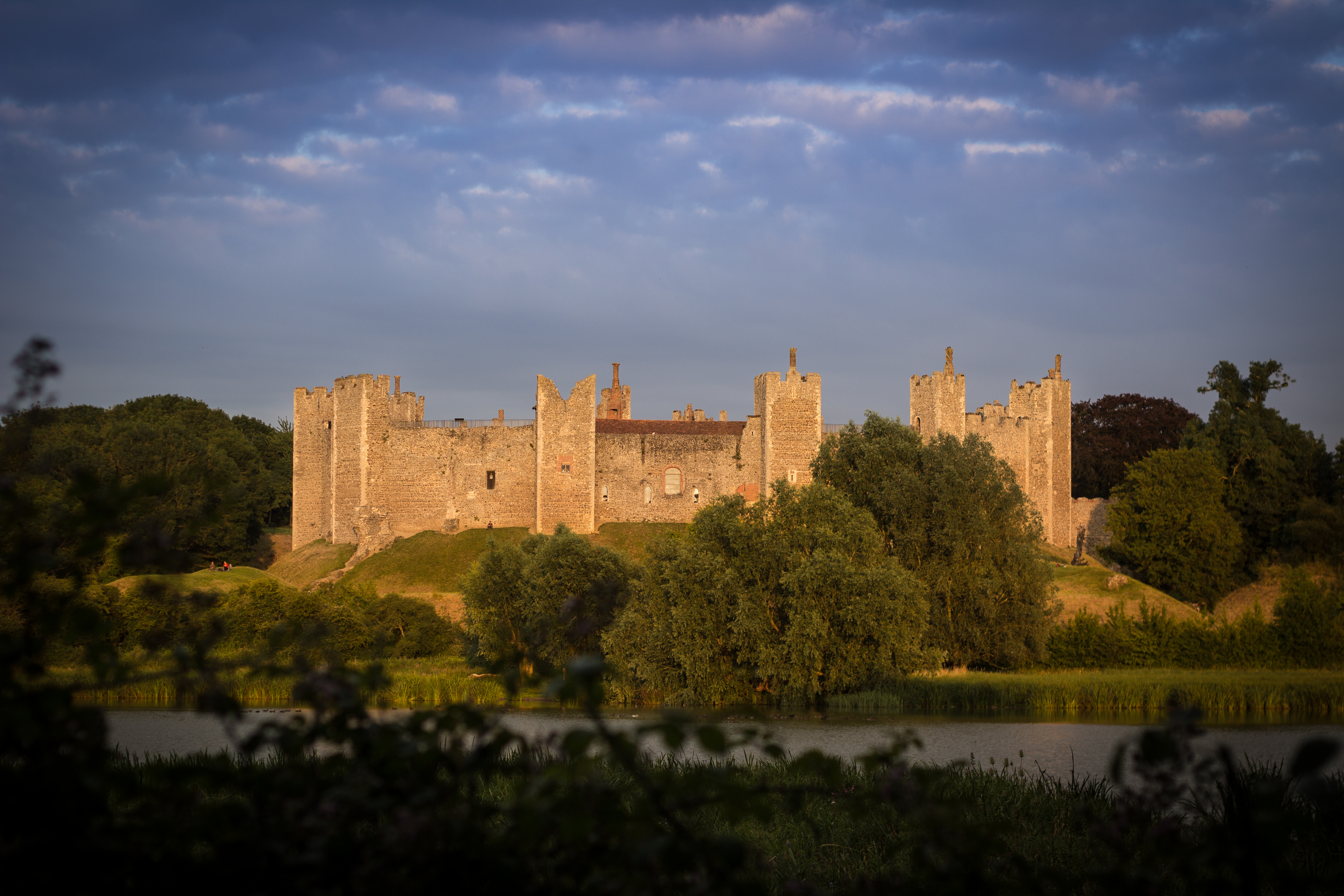
- A photograph of Framlingham Castle.

- Location within Suffolk
- Area: 18.97 km^{2} (7.32 sq mi)
- Population: 3,342 (2011)
  - Density: 176/km^{2} (460/sq mi)
- OS grid reference: TM283634
- Civil parish: Framlingham
- District: East Suffolk
- Shire county: Suffolk
- Region: East
- Country: England
- Sovereign state: United Kingdom
- Post town: WOODBRIDGE
- Postcode district: IP13
- Dialling code: 01728
- Police: Suffolk
- Fire: Suffolk
- Ambulance: East of England
- UK Parliament: Central Suffolk and North Ipswich

Framlingham is a market town and civil parish in Suffolk, England. Of Anglo-Saxon origin, it appears in the 1086 Domesday Book and was part of Loes Hundred. The parish had a population of 3,342 at the 2011 census and an estimated 4,016 in 2019. Nearby villages include Earl Soham, Kettleburgh, Parham, Saxtead and Sweffling.

== Governance ==
An electoral ward of the same name exists. The parish stretches north-east to Brundish with a total ward population taken at the 2011 census of 4,744.

== Features ==
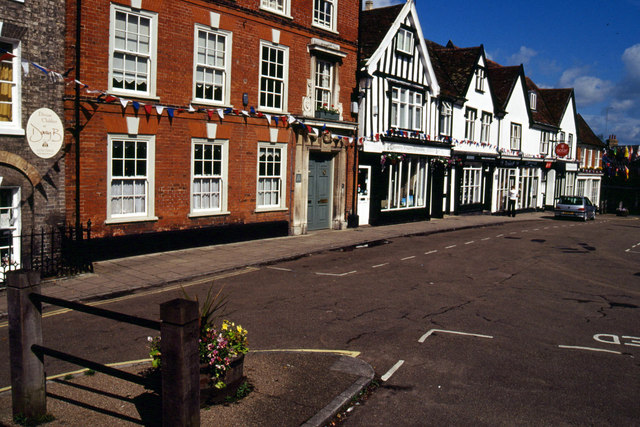
Market Hill, Framlingham

The name Framlingham derives from the Old English framelaingashām meaning the 'village of Framela's people'.

Framlingham's history can be traced to an entry in the Domesday Book (1086) when it consisted of several manors.

The medieval Framlingham Castle is a major feature and tourist attraction for the area and is managed by English Heritage. This Norman castle was first referenced in 1148, although some academics believe it could be as old as the 11th century. In the early 13th century the castle was the seat of Roger Bigod, 2nd Earl of Norfolk, one of the 25 barons who forced King John to seal Magna Carta in 1215; John laid siege to Framlingham Castle in 1216 in retaliation, and it surrendered after two days. Mary Tudor (daughter of Henry VIII and his first wife Catherine of Aragon) was proclaimed the first Queen of England here in 1553. The castle is referenced in the 2017 single "Castle on the Hill" by Ed Sheeran, who grew up in Framlingham. Adjacent to the castle is a large lake, or mere, which used to supply the castle with fish. It is managed by Framlingham College, which owns the mere. A nature walk in woodland can be made around the mere. There is also a large meadow adjacent to the castle that holds various outdoor events and productions in the summer and where people can picnic.

The Church of St Michael the Archangel is a prominent feature of the town. It dates from the 12th century (the main rebuilding dates from the late 15th and 16th centuries) and has a ring of eight bells dating from the 15th to 20th centuries. It also contains a very rare Thamar organ and a number of tombs of nobles. The church and other parts of the town feature as locations in the Anthony Horowitz novel Magpie Murders.

On 22 April 1967, David Bowie performed at the Assembly Hall on Church Street as vocalist of the band the Riot Squad, in what is believed to have been his only public performance in Suffolk.

Framlingham has a football team, located in Badingham Road. The town has the two oldest-functioning Post Office pillar boxes in the UK, dating from 1856, located on Double Street and on College Road. The pillar boxes are marked V. R. Victoria Regina, after Queen Victoria.

Framlingham is also home to one of the smallest houses in Britain, the "Check House". Converted into a two-storey residence of under 29 square metres (310 sq ft), the former bookmaker's office is in the Mauldens Mill Estate in the town centre. The ground floor measures 20 feet (6.1 m) by 7 feet 3 inches (2.21 m).

There is a traditional English market in the town square, Market Hill, every Tuesday and Saturday mornings offering fruit and vegetables, artisan bread and cakes, fresh fish, coffee, cheese and pies and other occasional stalls. A small museum is located within the castle.

Framlingham is surrounded by agricultural land. It lies some 14 miles (23 km) from the coastal town of Aldeburgh and 20 miles (32 km) from Southwold. It is also 10 miles (16 km) from the renowned music centre of Snape Maltings and 12 miles (19 km) from Woodbridge and the world-famous Anglo-Saxon burial site at Sutton Hoo. It is approximately 5 miles (8.0 km) from the A12, one of the main arteries into and out of Suffolk and approximately 15 miles (24 km) northeast of Ipswich.

In 2006, Country Life magazine voted Framlingham the best place to live in the country.

Framlingham is a Fairtrade Town and has a conservation area. An oak tree planted in 1911 in honour of the Coronation of King George V survives outside the old railway station, now a pub named The Station on Station Road. The town was the main location for the BBC television comedy series Detectorists. It has also appeared in numerous other TV programmes.

Various festivals and events are held in the town and around the castle throughout the year.

== Education ==
Framlingham College is an independent, co-educational secondary school for boarders and day students, opened as Albert Memorial College in 1865 in memory of Albert, Prince Consort. Its associated preparatory school is at Brandeston Hall.

Thomas Mills High School, dating from 1751, is considerably older than Framlingham College. It is a mixed secondary state school for pupils aged 11–18, which gained academy status in 2011. The singer Ed Sheeran attended this school.

Framlingham's primary school is Sir Robert Hitcham's Church of England Voluntary Primary School, dating back to at least 1654. It now has circa 350 pupils and another 26 in its nursery.

== Transport ==
The Framlingham Branch connected Framlingham by rail with the main Ipswich to Lowestoft East Suffolk line at Wickham Market. The railway station building stands adjacent to the Station Hotel. The branch closed to passenger traffic in November 1952 and to goods in April 1965. The nearest stations today are Wickham Market (7 miles (11 km)) at Campsea Ashe and Saxmundham (8 miles (13 km)), both on the East Suffolk Line.

The town is at the junction of the B1116, B1119 and B1120 roads, 4 miles (6.4 km) west of the A12. The local bus services are detailed on the Suffolk on Board site.

== Sport and leisure ==
Framlingham has a non-League football club, Framlingham Town F.C., which plays at Badingham Road, where there is also a sports club offering tennis, archery, badminton, hockey and croquet, and where the cycling club meets. The town has a rambling club and an active Scout and Cubs group. The modern St John Ambulance Centre is in Fairfield Road. In September 2025, Framlingham won "Most Active Town" at the Suffolk Community Awards, recognised for its parkrun and cross-country running scene, tennis and football tournaments, youth sports programmes, and its role hosting stages of the Tour of Britain cycling race.

Framlingham College, an independent school, has a swimming pool and gymnasium open to the public in pre-booked slots. Membership fees are required.

There are four pubs in the town: The Castle Inn (which was portrayed as the "Two Brewers" in the Detectorists TV series), The Railway, The Station and The Crown (which is also a restaurant and hotel). There is a library, a post office, a pharmacy, a small supermarket and a selection of specialised shops and coffee shops.

The town attracts a number of tourists, particularly in the summer months, drawn to the town itself, the castle, St Michael's Church, the locations for the Detectorists TV series, and walks that are available in and around the town and in the local countryside.

== Notable people ==
In order of birth:

- John Mowbray, 3rd Duke of Norfolk kept the castle as his East Anglian headquarters.
- Thomas Howard, 2nd Duke of Norfolk (1443–1524), who held office under four kings, died at Framlingham Castle.
- Theophilus Howard, 2nd Earl of Suffolk (1584–1640), politician, owned Framlingham Castle until 1635.
- Thomas Danforth, a Massachusetts Bay Colony magistrate and landowner born in 1623 in Framlingham, son of Nicholas
- Samuel Danforth, poet, Puritan and evangelist to American Indians, born in 1626 in Framlingham, son of Nicholas
- Nicholas Revett, architect and theorist, born in Framlingham in 1720
- Alethea Lewis (1749–1787), the novelist, brought up by her maternal grandfather in Framlingham
- Edmund Goodwyn (1756–1832), physician born in Framlingham, who discovered the diving reflex
- Robert Hindes Groome (1810–1889), composer, author and cleric, born in Framlingham
- Henry Thompson (1820–1894), polymath and surgeon who operated on the Belgian royal family, born in Framlingham
- John Cordy Jeaffreson (1831–1901), writer and lawyer, born in Framlingham
- Samuel Cornell Plant (1866–1921), master mariner and Senior Inspector, Upper Yangtze River
- Francis Stocks (1873–1929), county cricketer, died in Framlingham
- Frederick Bird (1875–1965), county cricketer and cleric, born in Framlingham
- Michael Lord (born 1938), deputy speaker and MP for the town, took the title Baron Framlingham rather than "Lord Lord" on becoming a life peer.
- Charles Freeman (born 1947), former Head of History at St Clare's, Oxford, and teacher of ancient history for Cambridge University's extramural programme, is a prolific author on ancient, Christian and early medieval history.
- Alice Russell (born 1976), soul singer, grew up in Framlingham.
- Christina Johnston (born 1989), classical coloratura soprano, grew up in Framlingham and attended Framlingham College.
- Laura Wright (born 1990), classical/popular crossover soprano, grew up in Framlingham.
- Ed Sheeran (born 1991), singer–songwriter, grew up in Framlingham and attended Thomas Mills High School. The town is the subject of his hit single "Castle on the Hill".

=== Notable Old Framlinghamians ===
A number of other notable individuals were educated at Framlingham College, although did not necessarily grow up in the town itself. They include:

- Jack Abbot, Labour MP for Ipswich
- Charles Alderton, American pharmacist and creator of the carbonated soft drink Dr Pepper
- Brian Aldiss, science fiction author
- David Bull, Chairman of Reform UK and television presenter
- Daisy Cooper, Deputy Leader of the Liberal Democrats and MP for St Albans
- Gordon Muriel Flowerdew (1885–1918), recipient of the Victoria Cross
- William Henry Hewitt (1885–1966), recipient of the Victoria Cross
- Augustus Willington Shelton Agar (1890–1968), recipient of the Victoria Cross
- Mark Hedley, High Court judge
- Percy Charles Pickard, World War II pilot and leader of Operation Jericho
- Alfred James Munnings (1878–1959), artist and President of the Royal Academy
- Barry Purves, Academy Award-nominated animator and director
- Charlie Simpson, musician, Busted and Fightstar
- Jeremy Sullivan, Lord Justice of Appeal

=== Notable Thomas Mills alumni ===
- Naomi Watts, actress, who attended the school briefly in the late 1970s
- Tom McRae, singer-songwriter
- Josh Webster, racing driver
- Jesse Quin, musician, Keane

== See also ==
- RAF Framlingham, a Second World War bomber airfield near Framlingham
- Quay House
