= Ed Sheeran =

English singer-songwriter (born 1991)

Ed Sheeran MBE
- Sheeran in 2022
- Born: Edward Christopher Sheeran; 17 February 1991 (age 35); Halifax, West Yorkshire, England
- Occupations: Singer-songwriter; musician
- Years active: 2004–present
- Spouse: Cherry Seaborn (m. 2019)
- Children: 2
- Awards: Full list
- Musical career
- Origin: Framlingham, Suffolk, England
- Genres: Pop; folk; rock
- Instruments: Vocals; guitar
- Works: Discography; songs
- Labels: Asylum; Atlantic; Elektra; Gingerbread Man; Interscope
- Publisher: Sony Music Publishing
- Website: edsheeran.com

Edward Christopher Sheeran (/ˈʃɪərən/ SHEER-ən; born 17 February 1991) is an English singer-songwriter. Born in Halifax, West Yorkshire, and raised in Framlingham, Suffolk, he began writing songs around the age of eleven. In early 2011, Sheeran independently released the extended play No.5 Collaborations Project. He signed with Asylum Records the same year.

Sheeran's debut album, + ("Plus") (2011), topped the UK Albums Chart and featured his breakout hit, "The A Team". His second studio album, × ("Multiply") (2014), became the second-best-selling album worldwide of 2015 and won the Brit Award for British Album of the Year. Its third single, "Thinking Out Loud", won two Grammy Awards, including Song of the Year. That same year, he established his own record label, Gingerbread Man Records.

Sheeran's third album, ÷ ("Divide") (2017), became the best-selling album worldwide of 2017 and charted ten top-10 singles on the UK singles chart. Its joint-lead singles, "Shape of You" and "Castle on the Hill", broke records in several countries by debuting in the top two positions on the charts, while its fourth single, "Perfect", reached number one in the US, Australia, and the UK. The world's best-selling artist of 2017, he was named the Global Recording Artist of the Year. His next albums, No.6 Collaborations Project (2019), = ("Equals") (2021) and − ("Subtract") (2023) each topped the charts in most major markets. During this period, he accumulated seven UK number-one singles: "I Don't Care", "Beautiful People", "Take Me Back to London", "Bad Habits", "Shivers", "Merry Christmas" and "Eyes Closed". He has since released the albums Autumn Variations (2023) and Play (2025) to varying critical and commercial success.

Sheeran has sold 200 million records worldwide, making him one of the world's best-selling music artists. He has 119 million RIAA-certified units in the US, and two of his albums are in the list of the best-selling albums in UK chart history. In December 2019, the Official Charts Company named him its artist of the decade, with the most combined success in the UK album and singles charts in the 2010s. As of September 2026, he is the fourth-most-followed artist on Spotify. Several of his tours are amongst the most-attended concert tours, and his ÷ Tour became the highest-grossing of all time in August 2019. An alumnus of the National Youth Theatre in London, Sheeran's acting roles include appearing in the 2019 film Yesterday, playing himself. In 2025, Time magazine listed him as one of the world's 100 most influential people.

== Early life and education ==
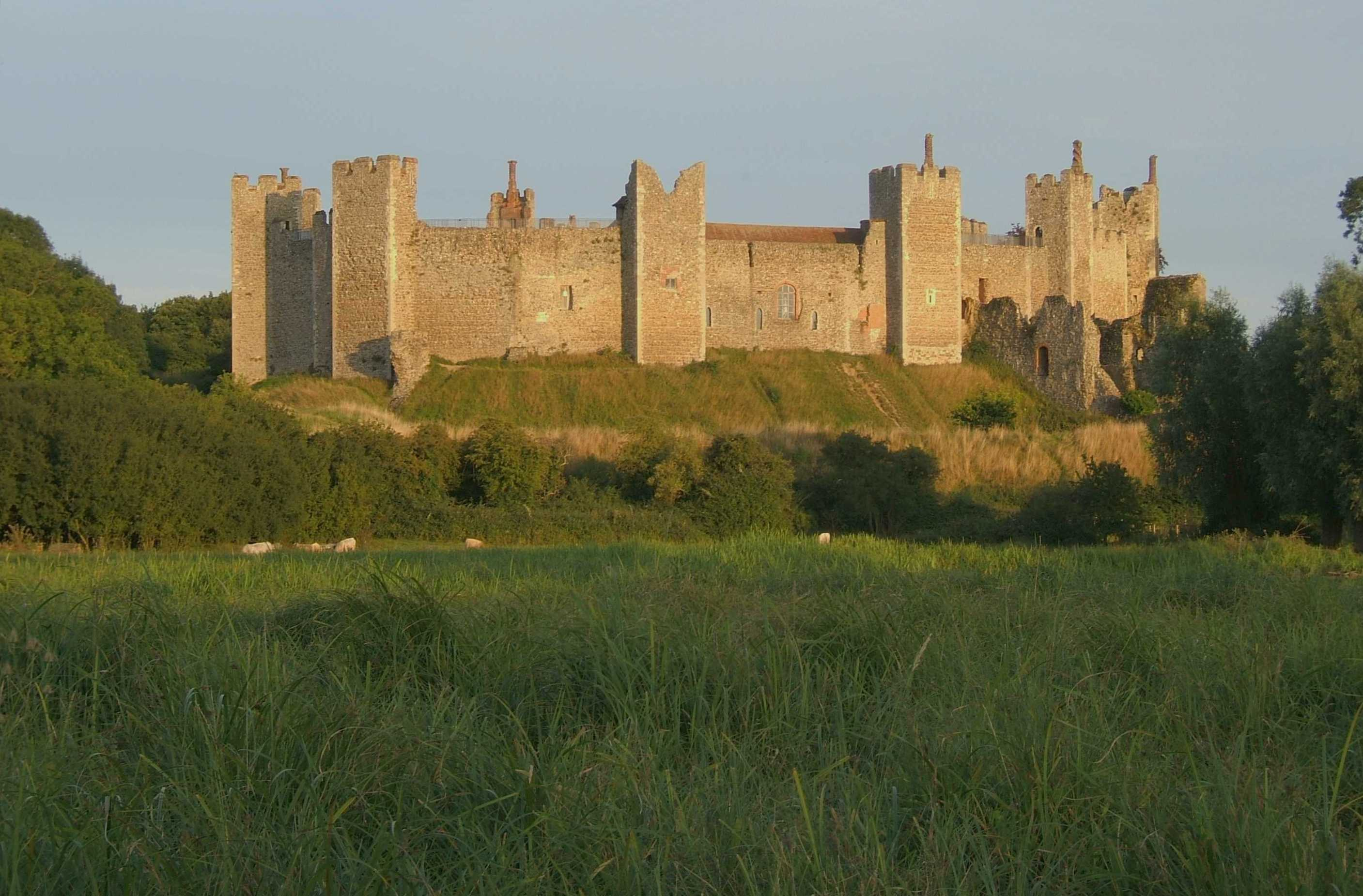
Framlingham Castle in Sheeran's home town of Framlingham, Suffolk. The castle and his upbringing in the town is the subject of his 2017 single "Castle on the Hill".

Edward Christopher Sheeran was born on 17 February 1991 in Halifax, West Yorkshire. His early childhood home was on Birchcliffe Road in nearby Hebden Bridge. His father, John, was a curator at Cartwright Hall in Bradford, and his mother, Imogen, worked at Manchester City Art Gallery. In December 1995, at the age of four, he moved with his family from Hebden Bridge to Framlingham in Suffolk, where he attended the independent Brandeston Hall preparatory school (now Framlingham College Prep School), and later Thomas Mills High School, also in Framlingham. He has an older brother named Matthew, who works as a composer.

Sheeran's parents, John and Imogen, are from London. His father is Irish, and Sheeran has stated that his father is from a "very large" Catholic family. John is an art curator and lecturer, and Imogen is a culture publicist turned jewellery designer. His parents ran Sheeran Lock, an independent art consultancy, from 1990 to 2010. Sheeran's grandfather was a Belfast Protestant who married a Catholic from the Republic of Ireland during a time of sectarian intolerance.

From a young age, Sheeran showed a strong inclination toward music. He sang at a local church choir at the age of four, learned how to play the guitar at age eleven, and began writing songs while at Thomas Mills High School in Framlingham. He also played the cello when he was younger. A 2004 school report described him as a "natural performer", and his classmates also voted him "most likely to be famous".

As a teenager, he was accepted into the National Youth Theatre in London. He successfully auditioned for Youth Music Theatre UK in 2007 and joined their production of Frankenstein – A New Musical in Plymouth. He later became a patron of Youth Music Theatre UK, now renamed British Youth Music Theatre, and of Access to Music, where he studied Artist Development. Sheeran is a second cousin of Northern Irish broadcaster Gordon Burns, who hosted the British game show The Krypton Factor.

== Career ==
=== 2004–2010: career beginnings ===
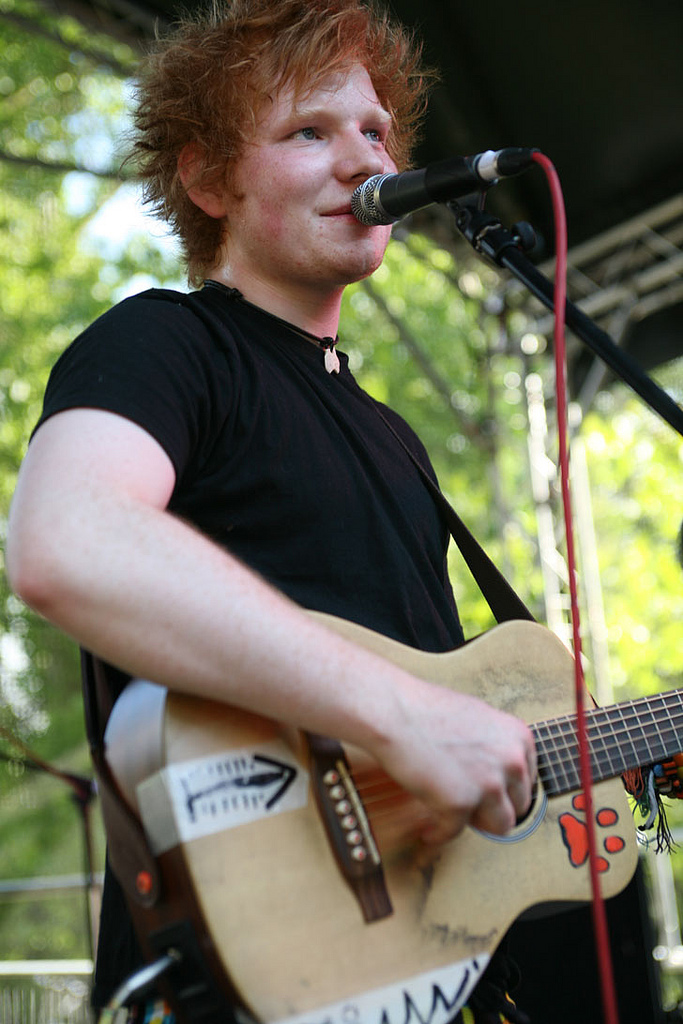
Sheeran performing at the Ipswich Arts Festival in July 2010

Sheeran began recording music in 2004, and at the age of thirteen independently released his first collection of work, titled Spinning Man. (Note: "In 2004, I made my very first album, Spinning Man, named after a picture that my dad had. I burnt the CDs myself and made the covers. There were 14 songs and they were all songs that rhymed. One lyric went: I'm a typical average teen, if you know what I mean. There are probably 20 copies of Spinning Man in existence and I have 19 of them. I don't want anyone else to get hold of a copy. Most of the songs were about a girl named Claire. She was my first love when I was 13. It was a very innocent love and we only ever held hands, but it lasted a fair amount of time. Then came my first devastating break-up. Looking back, it really wasn't that bad, but at the time it was soul-shattering. When she left me, I wrote a lot of songs off the back of it—my first love songs".) He has been friends with fellow English singer Passenger since he was 15, with the two playing the same gig in Cambridge. He moved to London in 2008 and began playing in small venues. In 2008, he auditioned for the ITV series Britannia High. He also opened for Nizlopi in Norwich in April 2008, after being one of their guitar technicians. In the autumn of 2009, Sheeran began studying music at the Academy of Contemporary Music (ACM) in Guildford, Surrey, as an undergraduate at the age of 18, but left without permission in the same year to support hip-hop artist Just Jack. He released another EP in 2009, You Need Me, and also collaborated several times with Essex singer Leddra Chapman, including CeeLo Green's "Fuck You". In February 2010, Sheeran posted a video through SB.TV—a channel launched by British entrepreneur Jamal Edwards—and rapper Example invited Sheeran to tour with him. In the same month, he also released his critically acclaimed Loose Change EP, which featured his future debut single, "The A Team".

Sheeran began to be seen by more people over the internet through YouTube and his fan base expanded, with him also receiving praise from The Independent newspaper and Elton John. He played a Station Session in St. Pancras International in June 2010. Some of the episode is on their Facebook page. Sheeran also self-released two other EPs in 2010, Ed Sheeran: Live at the Bedford and Songs I Wrote with Amy, which is a collection of love songs he wrote in Wales with Amy Wadge. When in Los Angeles in 2010, he was invited to perform at The Foxxhole, a club run by actor Jamie Foxx, which ended with an invitation to stay at Foxx's home.

On 8 January 2011, Sheeran released another independent EP, No.5 Collaborations Project, featuring grime artists such as Wiley, Jme, Devlin, Sway and Ghetts. With this EP, Sheeran gained mainstream attention for having reached number 2 in the iTunes chart without any promotion or label, selling over 7,000 copies in the first week. Three months later, Sheeran put on a free show to fans at the Barfly in Camden Town. Over 1,000 fans turned up, so Sheeran played four different shows to ensure everyone saw a gig, including a gig outside on the street after the venue had closed. Later that month, Sheeran was signed to Asylum Records.

=== 2011–2013: + ("Plus") ===
On 26 April 2011, Sheeran appeared on the BBC music show Later... with Jools Holland, where he performed his debut single, "The A Team". Six weeks later, "The A Team" was released as a digital download in the UK. The release served as the lead single from Sheeran's debut studio album, + ("Plus"). "The A Team" entered the UK Singles Chart at number three, selling over 58,000 copies in the first week. It was the best-selling debut single and the overall eighth-best selling single of 2011, selling 801,000 copies. The lead single also became a top ten hit in Australia, Germany, Ireland, Japan, Luxembourg, New Zealand, Norway and the Netherlands. During a headline set in the BBC Introducing tent at Glastonbury Festival 2011, Sheeran announced that "You Need Me, I Don't Need You" would be released on 26 August as the second single from the album. The second single peaked at number four on the UK Singles Chart. "Lego House" was released as the third single, reaching the top ten on the Australian, Irish and New Zealand Singles Charts. The music video for "Lego House" features actor Rupert Grint, as a play on their similar appearance. "Drunk", released on 19 February 2012, became Sheeran's fourth consecutive top-ten single in the UK, peaking at number nine.

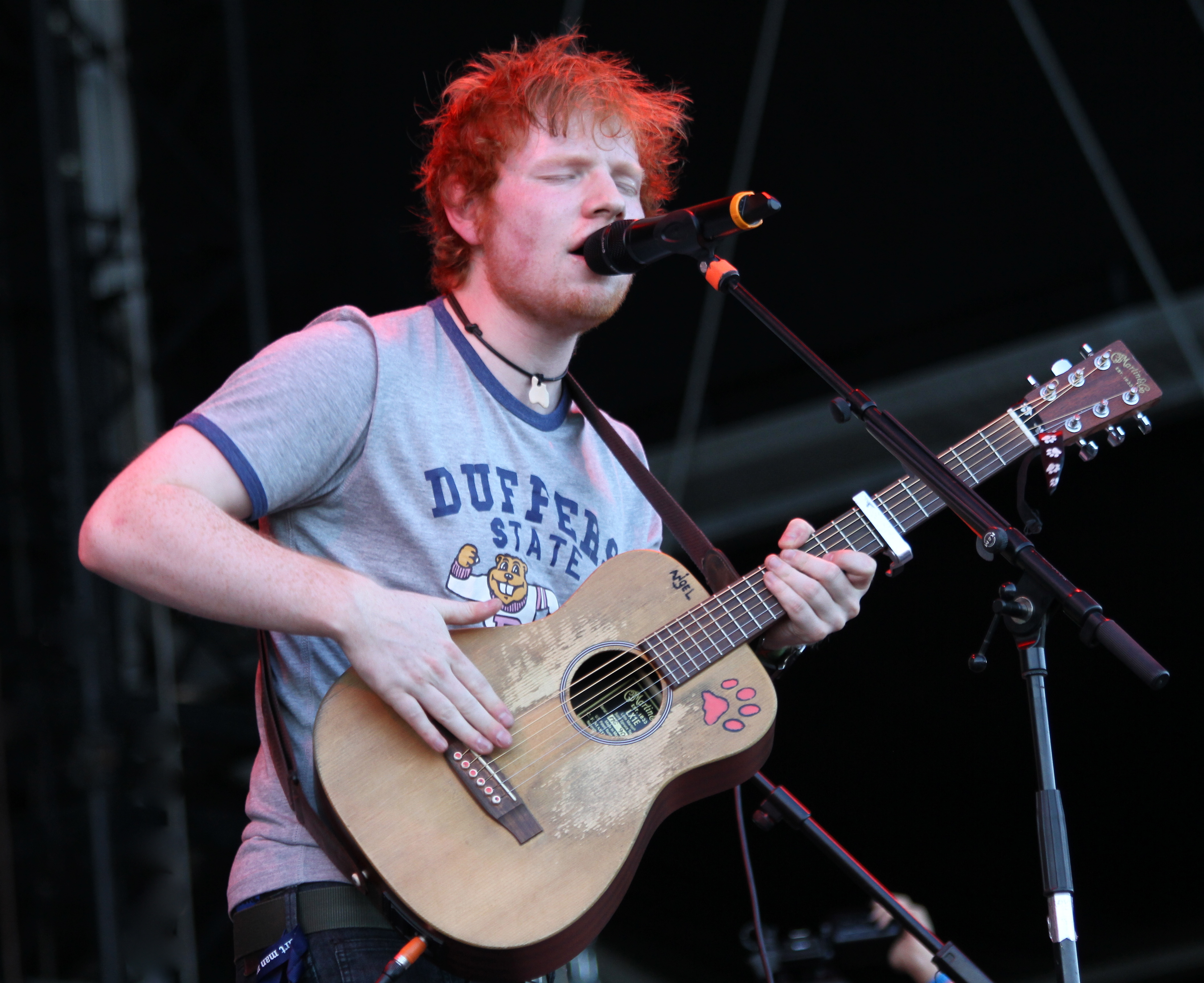
Sheeran at the Frequency Festival in Austria, August 2012

Sheeran released + on 12 September 2011. The album received generally favourable reviews from music critics and debuted at number one on the UK Albums Chart for sales of 102,000 copies. By the end of 2011, sales of the album in the UK stood at 791,000; it became the second-best-selling debut album and the ninth-biggest-selling album there. The album has been certified platinum six times by the British Phonographic Industry, denoting shipments of 1.8 million copies. As of March 2012, the album had sold 1,021,072 copies in the UK. The album also reached the top five in Australia, Canada, Ireland, New Zealand and the US.

The song "Moments" on the debut album by boy band One Direction, released in November 2011, was co-written by Sheeran. At the 2012 Brit Awards on 21 February, Sheeran won the Brit Awards for Best British Male Solo Artist, and British Breakthrough Act of the Year. On 10 January 2012, it was announced that Sheeran would support Snow Patrol on their US tour from late March until May. His song "Give Me Love" was featured in the episode "Dangerous Liaisons" of The Vampire Diaries. At the Ivor Novello Awards in May 2012, Sheeran's "The A Team" bested Adele's "Rolling in the Deep" and Florence and the Machine's "Shake It Out" for Best Song Musically and Lyrically. Sheeran performed "The A Team" at the Diamond Jubilee of Queen Elizabeth II concert held on The Mall outside Buckingham Palace on 4 June 2012 and a cover of Pink Floyd's "Wish You Were Here" at the closing ceremony of the 2012 Summer Olympics in London on 12 August 2012.

Taylor Swift contacted Sheeran after hearing his music while touring Australia in March 2012. He later co-wrote and provided vocals for "Everything Has Changed", a single featured on Swift's fourth studio album, Red. Sheeran also contributed two songs to One Direction's second studio album, Take Me Home, released in November 2012; the single "Little Things" became the group's second number-one in the UK. Sheeran's album peaked at No. 5 on the Billboard 200, while "The A Team" reached No. 16 on the US Billboard Hot 100. In late 2012 and early 2013, he headlined a US tour of 6,000–9,000-capacity venues. "The A Team" received a nomination for Song of the Year at the 2013 Grammy Awards. Elton John, who runs Sheeran's management company, canvassed the award organisers to get Sheeran a performance slot at the ceremony but was told that Sheeran alone was not high-profile enough. John decided to appear with Sheeran to circumvent this problem. Sheeran was also featured on some tracks from Irish singer Foy Vance's fourth album, Joy of Nothing.

From March to September 2013, Sheeran played at arenas and stadiums across North America as the opening act for Swift's The Red Tour. According to Sheeran, it was then his biggest tour, and he added a scarlet RED tattoo to commemorate it. In October 2013, Sheeran headlined three sold-out shows at New York's Madison Square Garden. At the concert, Sheeran debuted new songs, including "Tenerife Sea", a future track on his second studio album. Sheeran released "I See Fire" on 5 November 2013. The song is featured in the end credits of the film The Hobbit: The Desolation of Smaug, the film's soundtrack, and on the deluxe version of his second album. Sheeran was nominated for Best New Artist at the 2014 Grammy Awards.

=== 2014–2015: × ("Multiply") ===
On 24 March 2014, Sheeran performed at the Teenage Cancer Trust charity concert at the Royal Albert Hall in London where he unveiled "Take It Back", a track that would appear on the deluxe version of the second album. "Sing", the lead single, was released on 7 April 2014. Sonically, the song is a departure from Sheeran's previous recordings. "Sing" was intended to create hype over the album release, but from concern that this might alienate Sheeran's fan base, "One", an acoustic ballad, was released on 16 May 2014; "One" also marked the first of several promotional singles released leading to the album release. By early June 2014, "Sing" had earned Sheeran his first number-one single in the UK.

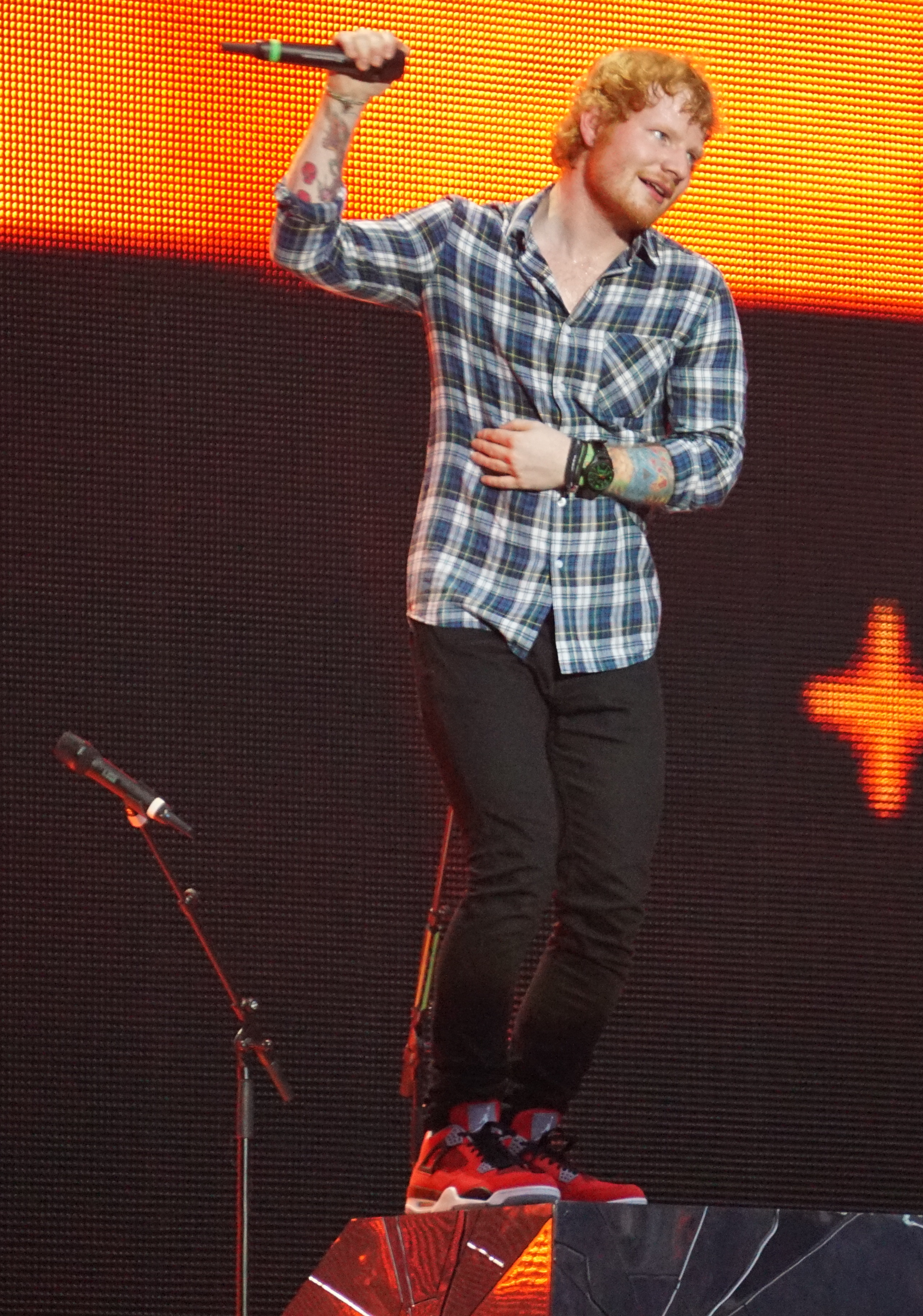
Sheeran on stage at Wembley Stadium, July 2015

Sheeran's second studio album, × ("Multiply"), was released worldwide on 23 June 2014. Spanning three years, Sheeran wrote more than 120 songs for the album. The album features tracks produced by Rick Rubin, Pharrell Williams, and Benny Blanco, as well as that of Gosling's. × peaked at number one in both the UK Albums Chart and the US Billboard 200. To support the album, Sheeran embarked on a world tour starting on 6 August 2014 at Osaka, Japan. On 27 September 2014, Sheeran was one of the headline acts at the Melbourne Cricket Ground prior to the 2014 AFL Grand Final. Following "Don't", "Thinking Out Loud" was released on 24 September 2014 as the album's third single. Unlike his previous music videos, Sheeran took the lead role in the single's accompaniment, where he performed a ballroom dance. It became his second single to reach number one in the UK, and it also spent eight weeks at number two on the US Billboard Hot 100 (with only "Uptown Funk" by Mark Ronson featuring Bruno Mars keeping it from top spot). In 2014, combined streams on Sheeran's catalogue in Spotify reached 860 million; Spotify named him the most-streamed artist and × the most-streamed album. In the same year, the album made Sheeran iTunes' best-selling artist in the UK, Ireland and New Zealand.

× was nominated for Album of the Year at the 57th Grammy Awards. Sheeran performed "Thinking Out Loud" alongside John Mayer, Questlove and Herbie Hancock at the ceremony. On 25 February, Sheeran won British Male Solo Artist and British Album of the Year for × at the 2015 Brit Awards. On 21 May he received the Ivor Novello Award for Songwriter of the Year. On 21 June, Sheeran co-hosted the 2015 Much Music Video Awards in Toronto, where he performed the singles "Thinking Out Loud" and "Photograph"; he also won two awards, Best International Artist and Most Buzzworthy International Artist or Group. On 27 June, Sheeran performed as the opening act for The Rolling Stones in their Zip Code Tour date in Kansas City's Arrowhead Stadium. On 10–12 July 2015, Sheeran performed sold-out shows at London's Wembley Stadium. The shows, which were announced in November 2014, were part of his world tour. The concert was documented and aired on 16 August 2015 on NBC; the one-hour special Ed Sheeran – Live at Wembley Stadium also included behind-the-scenes footage. In November 2015 Sheeran released the DVD Jumpers for Goalposts: Live at Wembley Stadium; the title is a nod to playing concerts at Wembley Stadium, the home of English football.

In 2015, Sheeran wrote "Love Yourself" for Justin Bieber's fourth album. Sheeran had initially planned to put the song on his third album and added that the track would have been scrapped before Bieber took the song. In August 2015, he sang along with Macklemore on the track "Growing Up". On 26 September, Sheeran performed at the 2015 Global Citizen Festival in Central Park's Great Lawn in New York, an event organised by Coldplay lead singer, Chris Martin, that advocates an end to extreme global poverty. Sheeran headlined the festival along with Beyoncé, Coldplay and Pearl Jam. The festival was broadcast on NBC in the US on 27 September and the BBC in the UK on 28 September. Sheeran co-hosted the 2015 MTV Europe Music Awards on 25 October in Milan, Italy. He won the awards for Best Live Act and Best Live Stage; the latter was in recognition for his performance at the 2014 V Festival in England. Sheeran won the Breakthrough award at the 2015 Billboard Touring Awards. His single from ×, "Thinking Out Loud", earned him two Grammy Awards at the 2016 ceremony: Song of the Year and Best Pop Solo Performance. In May 2016, × was named the second-best-selling album worldwide in 2015, behind 25 by Adele.

=== 2016–2018: ÷ ("Divide") ===
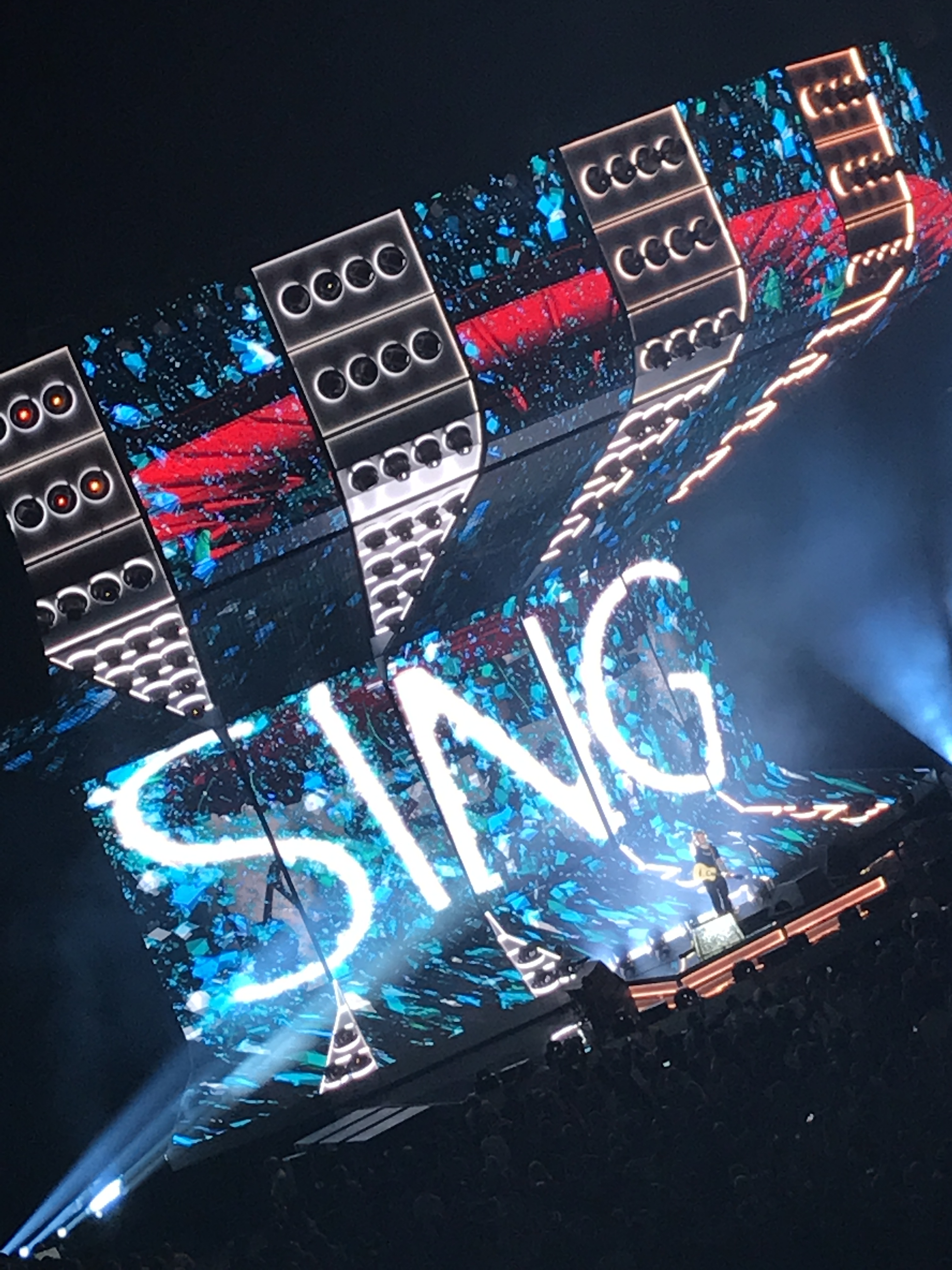
Sheeran performing in Miami during his Divide Tour, August 2017. It became the most attended, and highest-grossing tour of all time in August 2019.

On 13 December 2016, after a year long hiatus and social media break, Sheeran tweeted a picture and changed his Twitter, Facebook and Instagram to a light blue, implying the release of a new album—each of Sheeran's previous albums were a single-coloured background with a solid mathematical symbol. On 2 January, he posted a 10-second video on Twitter and other social media platforms, revealing the track list and cover art of his fourth studio album, ÷ ("Divide"), which was released on 3 March 2017. The album debuted at number one in the UK, the US, Germany, Australia, Canada and other major markets. With first week sales of 672,000 it is the fastest-selling album by a male solo artist in the UK, and third fastest in UK chart history behind 25 by Adele and Be Here Now by Oasis. It had the biggest first-week sales of 2017 in the US, until it was surpassed by Taylor Swift's Reputation.

On 6 January, Sheeran released two singles, "Shape of You" and "Castle on the Hill"; the theme of the latter single Sheeran's upbringing in his home town of Framlingham in Suffolk, with the castle referring to Framlingham Castle. Following the release of these singles, Sheeran co-hosted the BBC Radio 1 Breakfast Show with Scott Mills where it was implied that he would possibly make an appearance at the Glastonbury Festival in 2017. It was also during this show that Sheeran used a new Martin guitar that featured the ÷ logo (of his new album) on both the headstock and body of the acoustic guitar. Both singles went on to break the Spotify day one streaming record, with a combined total of over 13 million streams in 24 hours.

On 13 January, "Shape of You" and "Castle on the Hill" entered the UK Singles Chart at number one and number two, the first time in history an artist has taken the top two UK chart positions with new songs. The same day he also became the first artist to debut at number one and number two on the German Single Charts. On 15 January, the songs debuted at number one and number two on the ARIA Singles Chart, the first time this has been achieved in the history of the Australian chart. On 17 January, "Shape of You" debuted at number one on the US Billboard Hot 100, while "Castle on the Hill" entered at number six; this made Sheeran the first artist ever to have two songs simultaneously debut in the US top 10. The team behind TLC's song "No Scrubs" were given writing credits on "Shape of You" after fans and critics found similarities between elements of the two songs.

On 26 January, Sheeran announced dates for the beginning of the Divide Tour with shows in Europe, South America and North America from 17 March until 14 June 2017. On 17 February, Sheeran released "How Would You Feel (Paean)". Though not an official single, the song peaked at number two in the UK. By 11 March 2017, Sheeran had accumulated ten top-10 singles from ÷ on the UK Singles Chart, breaking Scottish DJ Calvin Harris's record of nine top-10 singles from one album. On 25 June, Sheeran headlined the final night of Glastonbury, performing in front of 135,000 people. At the 2017 MTV Video Music Awards Sheeran was named Artist of the Year. The fourth single from ÷, "Perfect", reached number one in the UK and Australia, and a stripped-down acoustic version of the song titled "Perfect Duet", a collaboration with Beyoncé, reached number one in the US and the UK, becoming the year's UK Christmas number one. On 7 November, Taylor Swift revealed that Sheeran collaborated on the song "End Game" for her sixth studio album, Reputation. The song, which also features rapper Future, was released on 10 November.

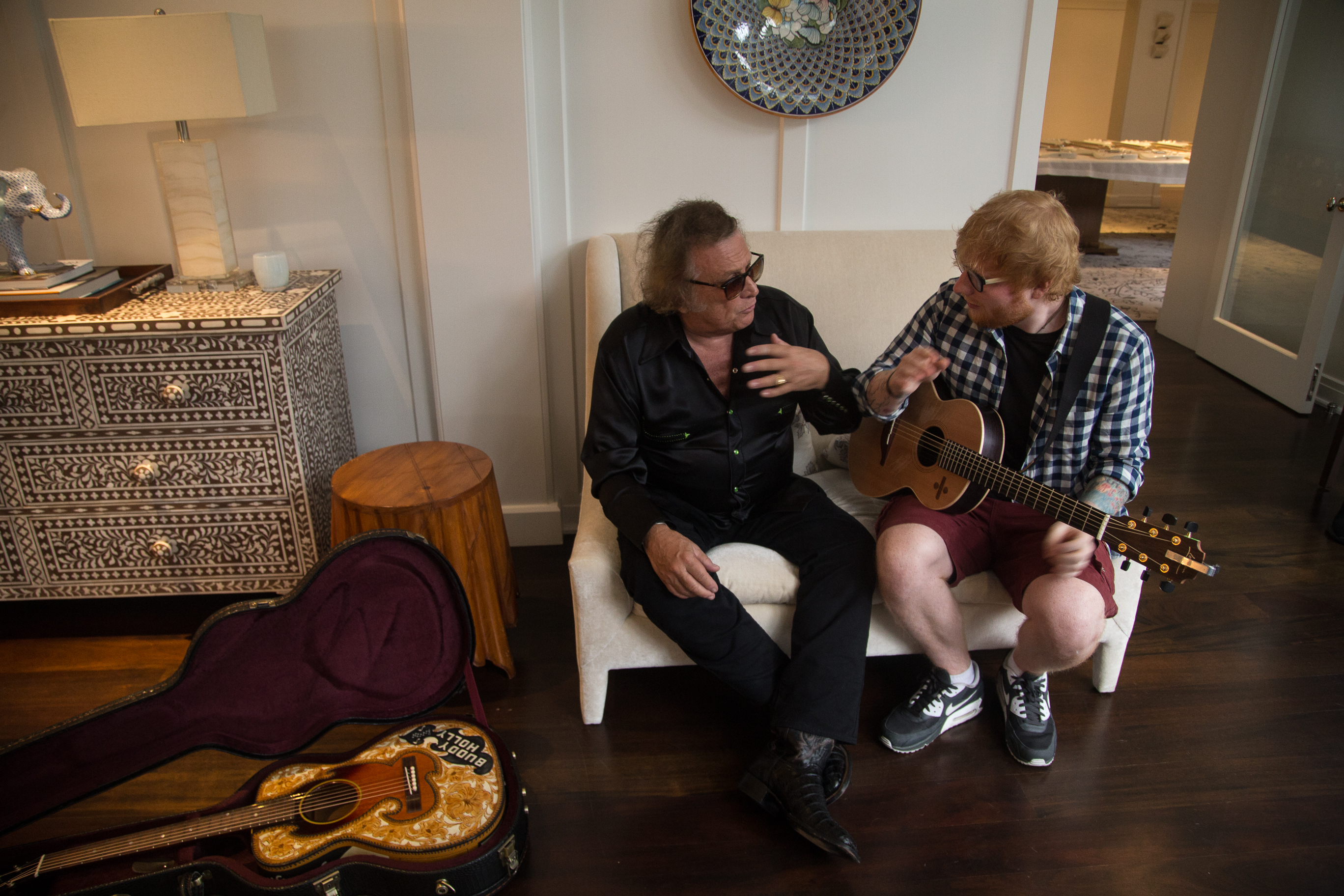
Sheeran backstage in Los Angeles with Don McLean in August 2018

On 4 December, Sheeran was named Spotify's most-streamed artist of 2017 with 6.3 billion streams. He has Spotify's biggest album of the year with ÷ streamed 3.1 billion times, and the top song with "Shape of You" with 1.4 billion streams. On 5 December 2017, hip-hop artist Eminem announced that Sheeran had collaborated on the song "River" for his ninth studio album, Revival. On working with Eminem, Sheeran stated, "He is one of the reasons I started writing songs, and was such a pleasure to work with him". In December 2017, Sheeran appeared on BBC Radio 1's Live Lounge, performing his song "Perfect" and a duet of The Pogues' festive classic "Fairytale of New York" with Anne-Marie.

On 3 January 2018, "Shape of You" was named the best-selling single of 2017 in the UK, and the best-selling single of 2017 on the Billboard Hot 100 in the US. The same day, ÷ was named the best-selling album of 2017 in the UK, and the US. As the best-selling artist worldwide for 2017, the International Federation of the Phonographic Industry (IFPI) named him the Global Recording Artist of the Year. At the 2018 Brit Awards held at the O_{2} Arena in London on 21 February, Sheeran performed "Supermarket Flowers", and received the Global Success Award from Elton John and Rolling Stones guitarist Ronnie Wood. Sheeran played to over 950,000 people in Australia and New Zealand in March and April, making it the biggest concert tour in Australasian music history, overtaking the previous record set by Dire Straits in 1986. In April, the IFPI named ÷ the best-selling album worldwide of 2017. At the 2018 Billboard Music Awards on 20 May, Sheeran performed "Galway Girl" from Phoenix Park in Dublin, Ireland, and picked up six awards, including Top Artist and Top Hot 100 Artist. In 2018 Sheeran wrote songs for boy bands. "Trust Fund Baby", by Why Don't We, was released on 1 February 2018, and "Summer On You", by PrettyMuch, was released on 21 June 2018.

=== 2019–2022: No.6 Collaborations Project and = ("Equals") ===
Sheeran speaking at a promotional event in New Zealand in 2019

On 10 May 2019, Sheeran released the single "I Don't Care", a duet with Justin Bieber, from his fourth studio album, No.6 Collaborations Project. On Spotify, "I Don't Care" debuted with 10.977 million daily global streams, breaking the platform's single-day streaming record. The song debuted at number one in the UK, Australia and other markets, and number two in the US. On 31 May, "Cross Me" featuring Chance the Rapper and PnB Rock, debuted at number 9 in the UK. Released on 28 June 2019, "Beautiful People" featuring Khalid debuted at number 3 in the UK and number 4 in Australia. On 5 July, Sheeran released two new songs, "Best Part of Me" featuring Yebba, and "Blow" with Bruno Mars and Chris Stapleton. On 12 July, he released the album, along with "Antisocial" with Travis Scott. The album debuted at number one in the UK, the US, Australia and other markets. On 26 August, Sheeran wrapped up the 260-show Divide Tour with the last of four homecoming gigs in Ipswich, Suffolk; the tour included, for example, his performance for over 100,000 people at Malmi Airport in Helsinki, Finland, on 24 July. On 30 August, the seventh single from the album, "Take Me Back to London", featuring Stormzy, reached number one in the UK.

In 2019, Sheeran co-wrote country music singer Kenny Chesney's single "Tip of My Tongue". In December 2019, Sheeran was named artist of the decade by the Official Charts Company for being the most successful performer in the UK album and singles charts of the 2010s. Eight of his songs featured in the Official Chart Company's chart of the decade with three songs inside the top 5—"Shape of You" was named number one. His four albums spent a combined 41 weeks at number one in the UK, the most weeks at number one in the 2010s, and five weeks more than Adele in second. He had the third and fourth best-selling album of the 2010s in the UK, with only Adele's two albums selling more. Globally, Spotify named him the second most streamed artist of the decade behind Drake. On 21 December 2020, after being on hiatus after having his first child with Cherry Seaborn in August, he released the surprise single, "Afterglow".

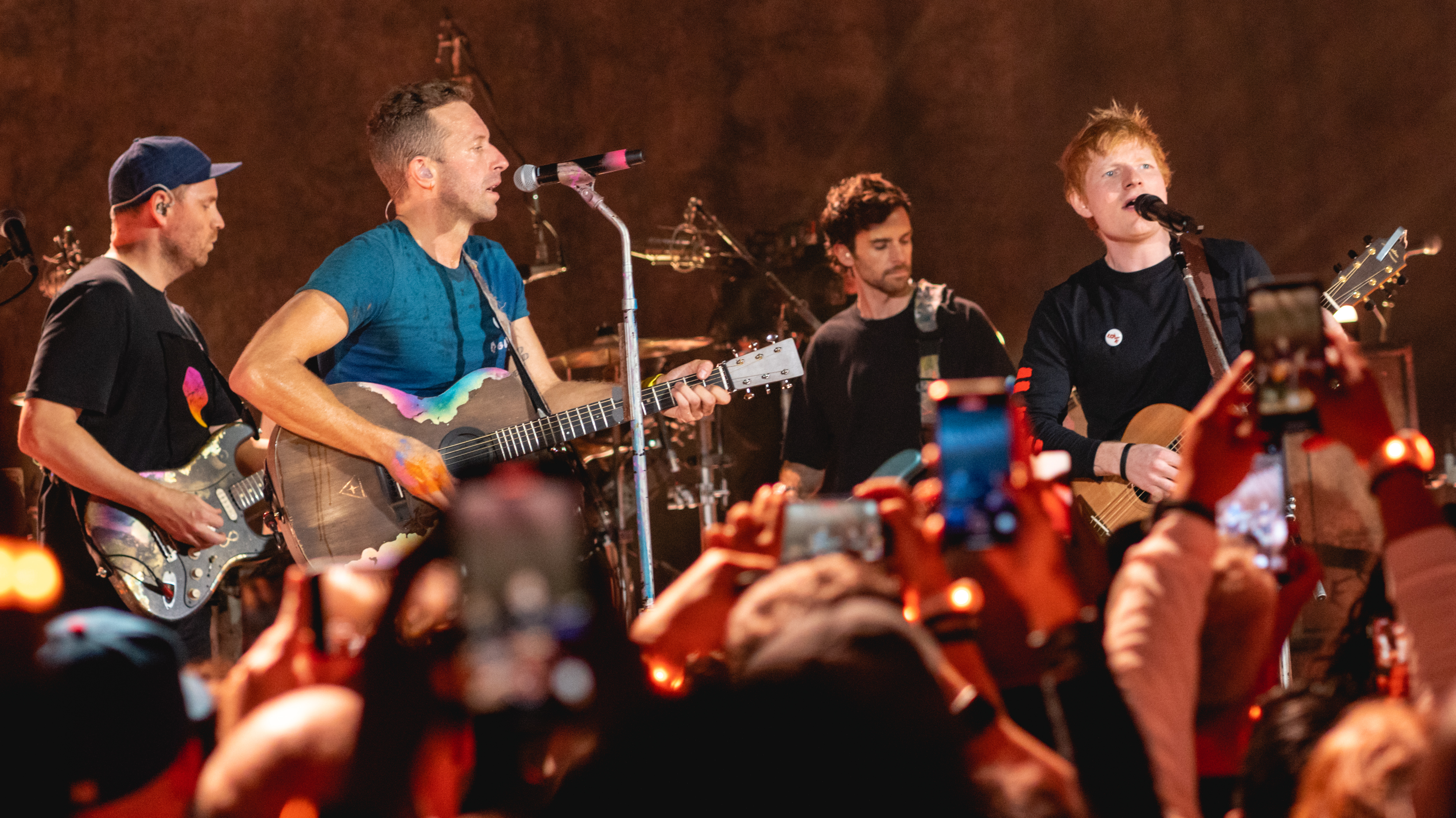
Sheeran (right) on stage with Coldplay at the O_{2} Shepherd's Bush Empire, west London in October 2021

On 25 June 2021, Sheeran released "Bad Habits", the lead single from his upcoming fifth studio album. His 10th UK number one single, the song spent eleven consecutive weeks at the top of the UK Singles Chart and Irish Singles Chart, topped the charts in Australia, Canada and Germany among others, and peaked at number two on the Billboard Hot 100 in the US. His eleventh week at number one in the UK saw him become the first British solo artist to notch up 52 weeks at Number 1 across his catalogue, with only Elvis Presley (80 weeks) and The Beatles (69 weeks) achieving more weeks at the summit. On 19 August, Sheeran announced that his fifth studio album, = ("Equals"), would be released on 29 October 2021. The cover was painted by him during the first COVID-19 lockdown, and is based on the changes his life had during the last four years, including marriage, having a child and losing friends. The promotional single "Visiting Hours" was released alongside the announcement. On 9 September, he was part of the 2021 Kickoff Experience ahead of the American NFL season opening game. Released on 10 September, "Shivers" dethroned "Bad Habits" at the top of the UK and Irish singles charts. Topping the charts in most major markets, = became his fifth UK number-one album, and fourth US number one.

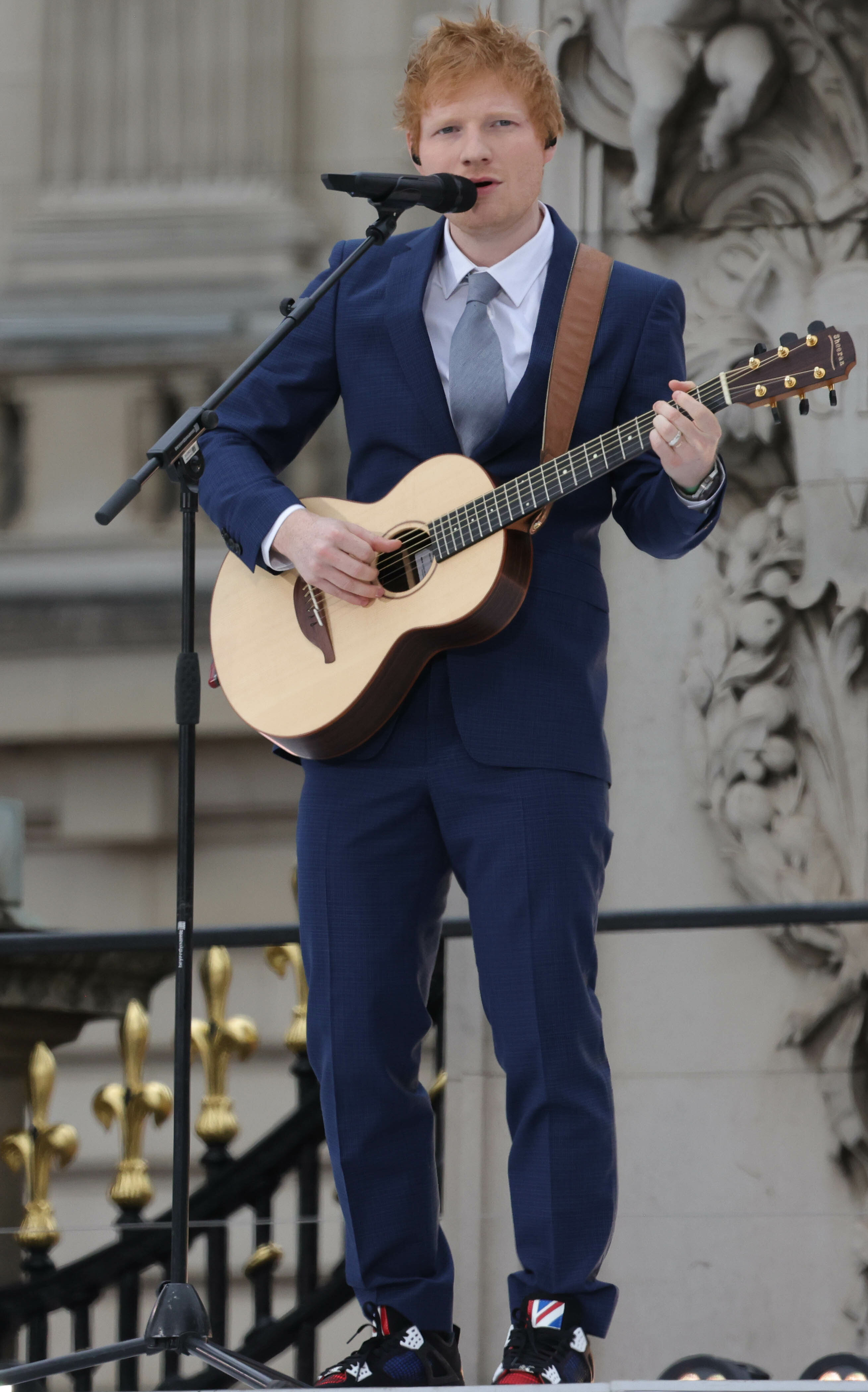
Sheeran playing in front of Buckingham Palace during the Queen's Platinum Jubilee in June 2022

On 29 November 2021, Sheeran and Elton John released "Merry Christmas", a duet single for charity. Inspired by a scene from the 2003 romantic-comedy film Love Actually, the song's music video sees the duo pay homage to scenes from past British Christmas hits, including "Last Christmas", "Walking in the Air", "Merry Christmas Everyone", and "Stay Another Day". All of the UK profits from the song went to the Ed Sheeran Suffolk Music Foundation and the Elton John AIDS Foundation. Debuting at number one in the UK Singles Chart on 10 December, it was Sheeran's 12th hit single. On 23 December, Sheeran featured on the remix of Fireboy DML's song "Peru".

On 11 February 2022, Sheeran released a duet version of "The Joker and the Queen" featuring Taylor Swift. On 4 March, he featured in "Bam Bam", collaborating for the second time with Camila Cabello. Later that month he collaborated with Colombian singer J Balvin in the singles "Sigue" and "Forever My Love". Sheeran commenced his +–=÷x Tour (Mathematics Tour) on 21 March. He played warm-up shows at the Electric Ballroom in Camden Town, London before the main tour began with two concerts at Croke Park in Dublin. On 22 April, Sheeran released the fifth single from =, "2step" featuring Lil Baby, before releasing a version of the song featuring Ukrainian pop-rock band Antytila. 2022 also saw Sheeran venture into heavier styles of music, releasing a new version of "Bad Habits" with the pop metal group Bring Me the Horizon in February. Later that year it was reported that he was in contact with Suffolk extreme metal group Cradle of Filth over a possible project, with frontman Dani Filth confirming progress on the collaboration in August. In July, he launched a collaboration with clothing brand Lucy & Yak which was inspired by the artwork of =.

On 29 September, Sheeran released the single "Celestial", a collaboration with Japanese media franchise Pokémon. In November, "Shivers" became Sheeran's 11th song to reach 1 billion streams on Spotify. He celebrated via an Instagram post, saying that he was currently filming a music video for his next album, scheduled to be released the following year. Sheeran was spotted at a beach in the coastal Suffolk town of Lowestoft.

=== 2023–2024: - ("Subtract") and Autumn Variations ===
On 1 March 2023, Sheeran officially announced on all social media platforms that his sixth studio album, − ("Subtract"), would be released on 5 May 2023. Sheeran released the album's lead single, "Eyes Closed" with its accompanying music video on 24 March 2023. "Boat" was released as the second single off the record on 21 April 2023. The third single, "Life Goes On", was released on 5 May 2023. In August 2023, Sheeran announced his second album of the year, Autumn Variations, released on 29 September 2023. It is his first studio album for which he owns the copyright, and also his first to be released through Gingerbread Man Records.

=== 2025–present: Play and label changes ===
On 14 February 2025, Sheeran announced his eighth studio album, Play, through a social media comment. Play was released through his own label, Gingerbread Man Records, making it his second album released by the label. The release of Play officially marked the beginning of his new era of music, the first of his 5 part album series with Play, Pause, Fast Forward, Rewind, and Stop. Play is also Sheeran's first pop album since = ("Equals"), with – ("Subtract") and Autumn Variations being mostly acoustic albums. The title had previously been hinted at in late 2023, when Sheeran left a comment on social media, writing “See you sometime next year when we press Play again on pop, and have a good holiday season x.” In early 2025, Sheeran changed his profile picture on Instagram and fans started speculating which mathematical symbol would be featured in his next release. In his comments as responses to fans, he hinted at Play again, writing: “Irony is if you ask me anything maths related I would fail the question, I never finished high school. Play coming soon though."

"Azizam" was released on 4 April 2025 as the lead single of the album. It was written as a tribute for his wife Cherry Seaborn. Sheeran collaborated with Ilya Salmanzadeh on this Persian-inspired song, which features Farsi lyrics. "Azizam" debuted at number three on the UK Singles Chart, becoming Sheeran's 42nd top 10 hit in his home country. It was also nominated for Song of the Year at the 2026 Brit Awards. To promote this single, Sheeran commissioned 34 giant inflatable hearts as part of a global campaign, since Azizam is Persian for ‘dear' or ‘beloved'. The inflatable hearts were rigged simultaneously in twelve different locations all over the world including Dubai, Berlin, Tokyo and New Delhi. A second single, "Old Phone", was released on 1 May 2025. The third single "Sapphire" was released on 5 June 2025, which was a collaboration with Arijit Singh, when he was on the tour of India. "A Little More" was released as the fourth single on 7 August 2025. A fifth single, "Camera" was released with the Album. Most recently, "Symmetry" (featuring Karan Aujla), was released as the sixth single on 17 October 2025. Play won Album of the Year at the Los 40 Music Awards. To support it, Sheeran embarked on the Loop Tour on 1 December 2025 in Auckland, New Zealand.

While promoting Play, Sheeran said during an interview with Zane Lowe that he was creating an album titled Eject for release after his death, containing songs he recorded from age 18, with Seaborn intended to select the final track listing. He also revealed that there would be a series of albums following Play, which includes Pause, Fast Forward, Rewind, and Stop.

In May 2026, Sheeran announced his departure from Warner Music, citing his desire for a change in his professional career. Two months later, it was announced he had signed with Universal Music's Interscope Records.

== Musical style and influences ==
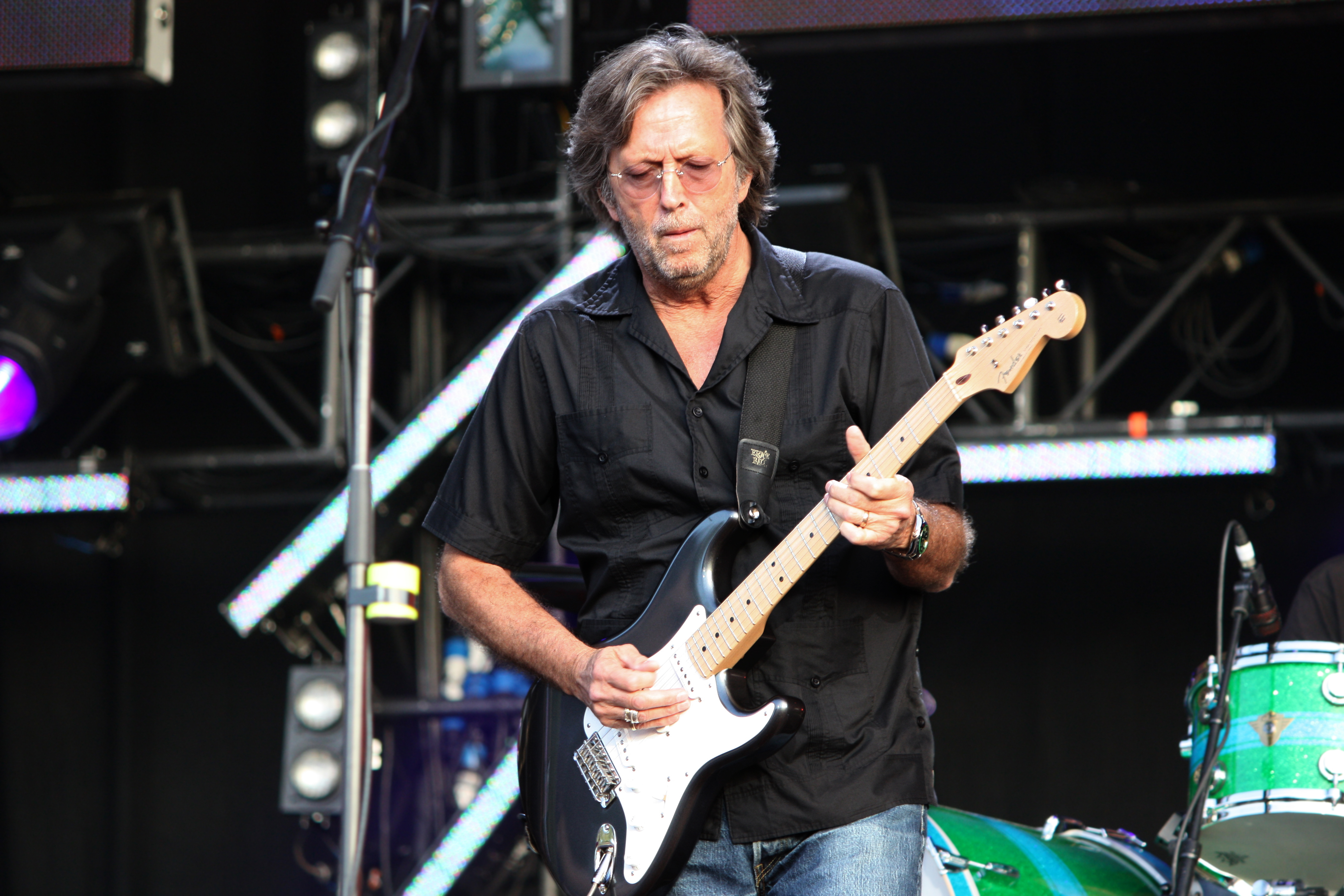
Sheeran appeared on stage with one of his idols Eric Clapton (pictured) at the Nippon Budokan Arena in Tokyo, Japan on 13 April 2016 performing Clapton's "I Will Be There"

Sheeran's musical style has been described as pop, folk-pop, and soft rock, with occasional hip-hop influences. Sheeran's earliest memories include listening to the records of Joni Mitchell, Bob Dylan and Elton John's Greatest Hits. According to Sheeran, the album that introduced him to music was Van Morrison's Irish Heartbeat. During his childhood his father took him to live concerts that would inspire his musical creations. These included seeing Eric Clapton at the Royal Albert Hall, Paul McCartney in Birmingham, and Bob Dylan. On the influence of Clapton, Sheeran states, "He's the reason I started playing guitar". He singled out Clapton's performance at the Party at the Palace in the grounds of Buckingham Palace, "I was eleven when I saw Eric Clapton play at the Queen's Golden Jubilee concert in June 2002. I remember him walking on stage with this rainbow-coloured Stratocaster and playing the first riff of 'Layla'. I was hooked. Two days later I bought a black Stratocaster copy for £30 that came with an amp. All I did for the next month was try to play that 'Layla' riff".

In a complicated world, Sheeran's musical modus operandi is straightforward; to create well-crafted, expertly vague songs that unite people. His songs are vessels broad enough to soundtrack both a first dance and a funeral procession, a gut-punch break-up and a trawl around a harshly lit shopping centre. They're for life's big moments, with all the cinematic edge of a Richard Curtis film. He's also malleable – when he's done with hip-hop, for example, he doesn't need an image overhaul to then revert to balladry. If one genre isn't to your tastes, then fear not, another will be along soon.

— Michael Cragg in The Guardian on Sheeran's style of music and mass appeal.

Sheeran has also cited the Beatles, Nizlopi and Eminem as his biggest musical influences. He is also a fan of heavier music and cites bands such as Cradle of Filth, Slipknot, Korn, Marilyn Manson and Bring Me the Horizon as other influences. As a teenager, he also had a Kerrang! subscription. According to Sheeran, he had a stutter in his speech when he was younger, and he credited rapping along to Eminem's The Marshall Mathers LP for helping him stammer less. He was also inspired by "Cannonball" singer-songwriter Damien Rice in 2002, with Sheeran stating, "seeing him play this small club in Ireland, I was able to meet him, and he was unbelievably cool. I went straight home and started writing songs. I would not be doing what I'm doing now if he'd been a jerk". He also played the guitar to Westlife's Greatest Hits album when he was ten, citing them as one of his influences. Sheeran collaborated with his idol Eric Clapton in April 2016, with Sheeran stating to People magazine, "I sang on Eric Clapton's album I Still Do. It's one thing having him on mine, but being on his, that's an honour that you can't ever pinpoint on how great that is. I did something for his record, and I was credited as 'Angelo Mysterioso', appearing as a guest on Clapton's 'I Will Be There', in addition to performing the song with Clapton on stage, and he did something for my record performing a guitar solo on 'Dive' on Sheeran's album ÷ and was credited as 'Angelo Mysterioso'". Sheeran also cited Taylor Swift as one of his influences, suggesting in 2015 their respective success drives each other on.

In 2024, Ed Sheeran also confirmed punk band the Offspring as an influence. His aunt gave him ten pounds to buy a CD and the first CD he purchased was Conspiracy of One and he used to play their song "Million Miles Away" in front of a mirror. Sheeran later performed the song with the band.

More recent releases have seen increased non-western influence in his music: his 2025 single "Azizam", which debuted at No. 3 in the UK, included Persian musical influences and "Sapphire" was noted for its Punjabi undertones.

== Other ventures ==
=== Gingerbread Man Records ===
In March 2015, Sheeran announced he was setting up a record label, Gingerbread Man Records, which is a deal with Warner Music Group. The label was launched in August 2015 alongside its accompanying YouTube channel. Jamie Lawson, the label's first signee, met Sheeran while they were both in London's folk circuit. Lawson released his self-titled debut album on 9 October 2015, which has earned him a number one in the UK Albums Chart. Sheeran signed his second artist, Foy Vance, in November 2015. Maisie Peters also signed with the label in 2021, and released her first debut studio album You Signed Up for This in August 2021. Gingerbread Man Records has now released 14 albums by these 3 artists and Sheeran himself.

=== Bertie Blossoms ===
On 29 September 2019, Sheeran announced he was teaming up with his manager Stuart Camp to open a bar located on Portobello Road in Notting Hill. The bar is called "Bertie Blossoms", and named after his wife Cherry Seaborn. Their restaurant is described as "blending Spanish flair, British comfort, and a little bit of everything else we love from around the world. Think crispy bites, bold flavours and dishes made for sharing, because let's be honest, it's more fun that way."

=== Charity work ===
Sheeran performed a gig in Bristol, which raised £40,000 for a charity that reaches out to street sex workers. "It's good to show insight that these people are real people with real emotions and they deserve the same charity work as anyone else," Sheeran said. "There's a lot more popular charities that get a lot of attention. And with certain subjects like this they're often washed over and people don't necessarily give them the attention they deserve". Tickets were available to those taking part in the charity's Give it up for One25 campaign by giving something up for 125 hours and hitting the £40,000 fundraising mark.

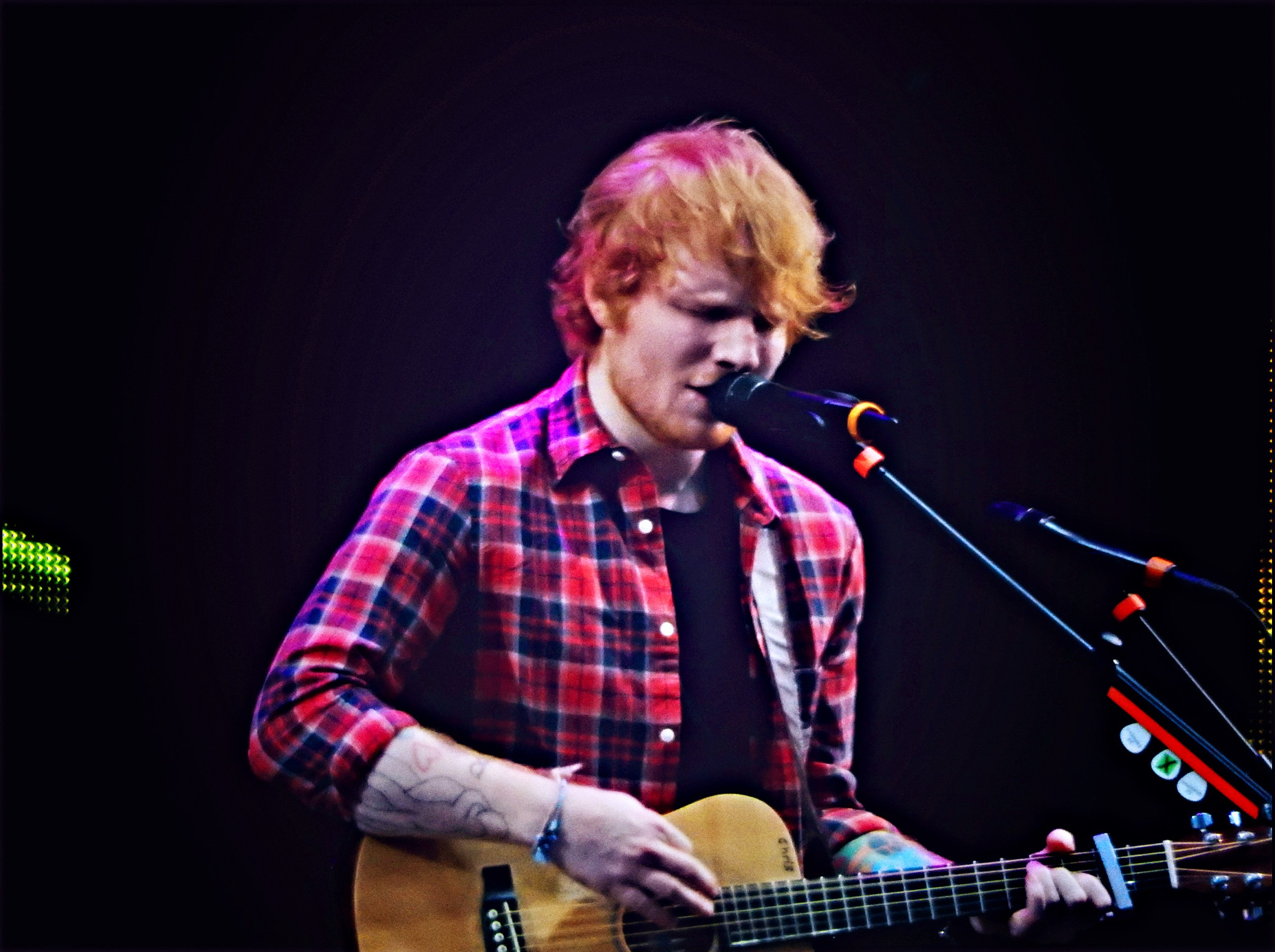
Sheeran often wears hoodies or tartan shirts, and frequently donates his clothes to charity shops in Suffolk.

Sheeran frequently gives away his clothes to charity shops around Suffolk, his home county. An ambassador for East Anglia's Children's Hospice, he has donated clothes to the St Elizabeth Hospice charity shop in his home town Framlingham, including eight bags of clothes to the shop in February 2014. In 2016, he donated 13 bags of clothes to the shop. The tartan shirt worn by Sheeran when he met Renee Zellweger's character, Bridget, in Bridget Jones's Baby, was auctioned online to raise further funds for the hospice.

On 15 November 2014, Sheeran joined the charity supergroup Band Aid 30 along with other British and Irish pop acts, recording the latest version of the track "Do They Know It's Christmas?" at Sarm West Studios in Notting Hill, London, to raise money for the West African Ebola virus epidemic.

In November 2015, Sheeran supported the No Cold Homes campaign by the UK charity, Turn2us. Sheeran was one of nearly thirty celebrities, which included Helen Mirren, Jeremy Irons and Hugh Laurie, to donate items of winter clothing to the campaign, with the proceeds used to help people in the country struggling to keep their home warm in winter.

Sheeran teamed up with the cast of the BBC3 mockumentary sitcom People Just Do Nothing to perform a charity single for the BBC's biennial telethon Comic Relief which aired in March 2017. He appeared in a November 2017 episode of Gogglebox along with other UK celebrities such as Ozzy Osbourne, former Oasis frontman Liam Gallagher, and Labour Party leader Jeremy Corbyn as part of Channel 4 and Cancer Research UK's Stand Up to Cancer fundraising campaign.

In December 2019, he launched his own music foundation, Ed Sheeran Suffolk Music Foundation (ESSMF). In the statement, Sheeran stated it will help artists aged under 18 with "small but hopefully useful grants". In May 2020, Sheeran donated £170,000 to his former school Thomas Mills High School in Framlingham, Suffolk. The donations, which have been made over a two-year period via the Ed Sheeran Suffolk Music Foundation, helped the school to purchase items such as MacBooks, cameras and a photography darkroom. The same month, Sheeran made a donation to Ipswich Hospital. In June 2020, Sheeran made a "founding gift" to launch Suffolk Community Foundation's "Rebuilding Local Lives Appeal" in response to the COVID-19 pandemic on the celebration day of the county, "Suffolk Day". Sheeran has donated over £1 million to local charities in Suffolk amid the COVID-19 pandemic, including to a children's hospital ward.

Sheeran's parents organised The Ed Sheeran Made in Suffolk Legacy Auction on 23 October 2020 which ran until 8 November. The auction had 220 lots, including items donated by other celebrities such as David Beckham, Kylie Minogue and Usain Bolt. Sheeran has donated some of his personal items including handwritten lyrics from his song "Perfect", lego bricks he played with as a kid, handmade You Need Me EP from 2009 and a £3 ticket to his first gig at the British Legion in Framlingham. The auction was made to raise money for Suffolk charities such as GeeWizz and Zest who both support children and young adults in the county, including redeveloping a playground for kids with special educational needs and disabilities in Ipswich. In November Sheeran sold one of his paintings, marking the first and only time his art has been made available for sale, which he titled "Dab 2 2020", to the same auction. Later that month, Sheeran backed footballer Marcus Rashford's free school meals campaign and opened his own breakfast club at his Notting Hill restaurant, Bertie Blossoms. He announced on his Instagram that he provided hot breakfasts for "anyone who is normally entitled to a free school meal or who is struggling in these strange times". Sheeran's charity, the Framlingham Foundation Trust, is reported to have donated money to give a primary school teacher to take an imperative course to help children create songs with untraditional instruments which will benefit children with learning difficulties.

=== Acting ===
Sheeran made his acting debut in 2014, a cameo role as himself on New Zealand soap opera Shortland Street, filmed while he was in the country for a one-off performance. In May 2015, he appeared as himself and performed on a live episode of the NBC sitcom Undateable. Later that year, while in Australia, he recorded scenes for the soap Home and Away, as a character based on himself.

After recording a cover version of Foy Vance's "Make It Rain" for Sons of Anarchy, Sheeran was cast by creator Kurt Sutter to play Sir Cormac in the medieval drama The Bastard Executioner on FX. Sheeran also appeared as himself in the 2016 film Bridget Jones's Baby in a scene where Bridget Jones, played by Renée Zellweger, encounters the singer at the Glastonbury Festival.

In July 2017, Sheeran appeared in a scene on Game of Thrones opposite Maisie Williams, who plays Arya Stark. David Benioff explained that since Williams was a big fan of the singer, they wanted to have Sheeran appear on the show to surprise Williams, and that they had tried to get him on for years. It was noted that Sheeran deleted his Twitter account around this time of the episode release.

In June 2019, Sheeran made his debut appearance in an advertisement for Heinz Tomato Ketchup. A lifelong fan of the product—he has it with everything from fish and chips to his morning sausage "butty" to upmarket dinners, carries a bottle on tour, and has a Heinz Ketchup tattoo on his arm—he put forward an idea he had written for their next TV campaign, and the company responded. A representative from Heinz stated that "1/3 of @HEINZ Instagram posts include people mentioning or tagging Ed, dating all the way back to 2014". Poking fun at people who turn their nose up at those who ask for ketchup in fancy restaurants, the advert sees him walking into a "super posh" restaurant while narrating the message he had sent to the company. As the other wealthy diners look on in horror at the sight of a ketchup bottle, he flips the bottle, bangs it against his hand to budge the ketchup and smothers it all over his food. The company released a limited edition ketchup product known as Ed Sheeran X Heinz ketchup, also known as "Heinz Edchup".

Released in June 2019, Sheeran also appeared as himself in a supporting role in the Richard Curtis/Danny Boyle film Yesterday, a film about a struggling singer-songwriter who wakes up to find that no one but he remembers the Beatles.

Later, in October 2019, Ed Sheeran makes a surprise cameo in the Amazon series Modern Love in Season 1, Episode 7, "Hers Was a World of One". He plays a character named Mick, a charming, somewhat mysterious busker who briefly enters the life of the main character.

In 2021, Sheeran made a surprise cameo appearance at the end of the Netflix film Red Notice, an action comedy by Rawson Marshall Thurber starring Dwayne Johnson, Ryan Reynolds, and Gal Gadot. He appears as himself, playing a wedding singer who gets arrested alongside the main characters. Thurber was a huge fan of Sheeran, and contacted him through a mutual friend early on in pre-production to request the cameo.

In 2023, Sheeran made a surprising and unrecognizable cameo in the British comedy Sumotherhood, directed by Adam Deacon. He plays a character referred to as "Crack Ed," and appears in a gritty, humorous scene where he is held at gunpoint in an outdoor, wooded setting. This is one of his rare appearances as a character in a film, rather than playing himself.

== Impact ==
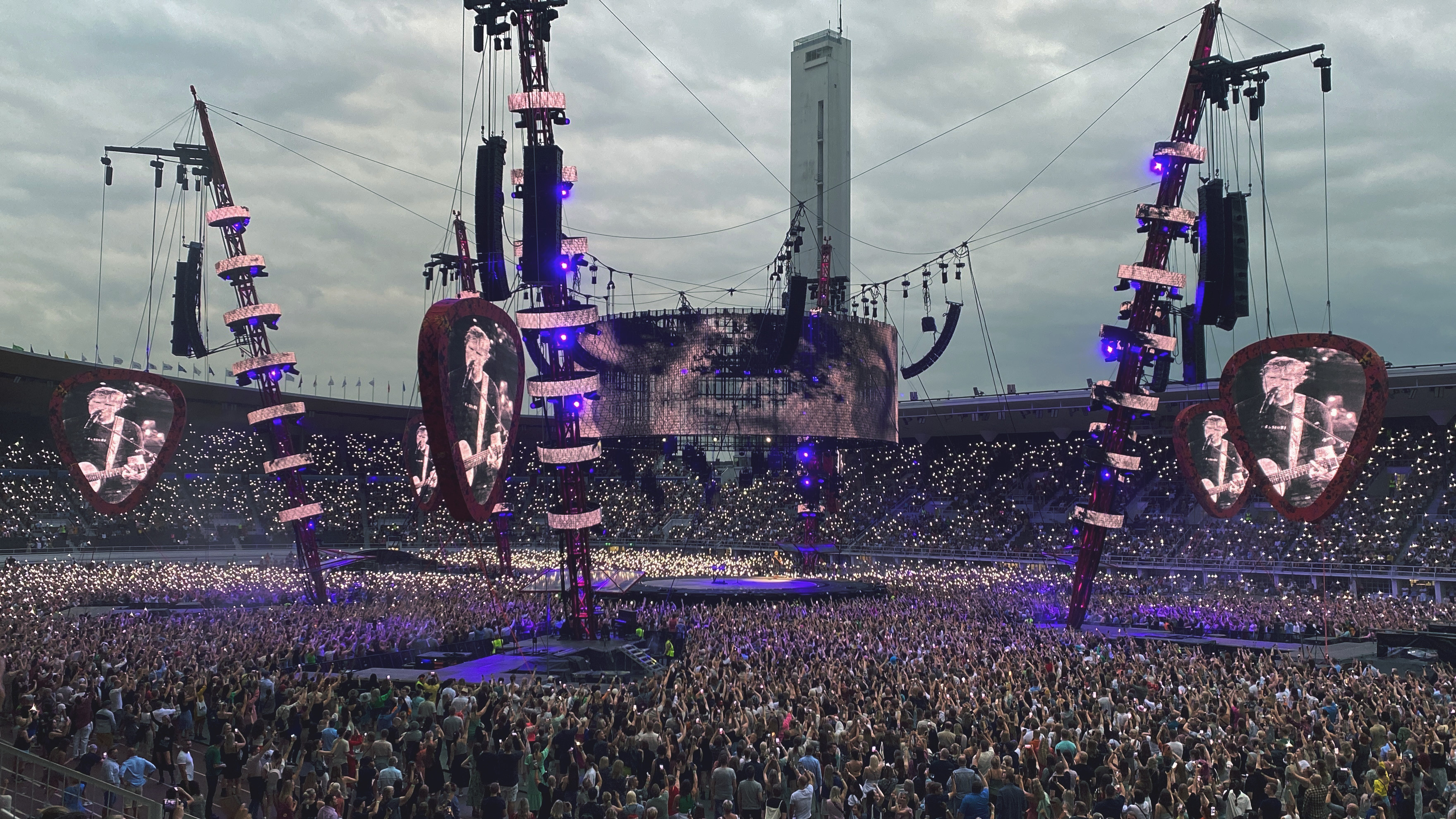
Sheeran concert in Helsinki, August 2022. He had the highest-grossing tour of the 2010s, while his +–=÷x Tour ranks among the highest-grossing of the 2020s.

Music journalist Alexis Petridis has stated that Ed Sheeran "brought pop back down to earth" with his music style, introducing himself "touting an even more austere version of Coldplay's dressed-down authenticity: one unassuming man, his guitar and a loop pedal". Noting him as "one of the most influential" artists of his generation, as he spawned "endless imitators", Petridis remarked that the music charts were "packed with Sheeran-alikes" after ×, describing it as "the wave of earnest, dressed-down, boy-next-door troubadours" that reached critical mass. Similarly, The Guardian writer Laura Snapes cited him as "the godfather of the current crop of singer-songwriters" in 2019, stating that Sheeran inspired "troubadours" to enter the music charts, and marked "the calcification of the everyman male pop star", and the end of record labels marketing them "exclusively to teenage girls and their mums". Billboard writer Jason Lipshutz noticed that his appeal and performance style had influenced up-and-coming soloists, impacting "a significant number of pop artists who crave his type of singular success". The Financial Times considered that the scale of Sheeran's commercial accomplishments has "broken through to such a wide and lucrative extent, far beyond the achievements of any of the other singer-songwriters in the market" in the UK.

iHeartMedia senior executive Sharon Dastur declared that Sheeran's success has allowed newer artists to be given an opportunity in the mainstream scene with quieter material at the forefront, instead of dance music. GQ's George Chesterton deemed Sheeran "the de facto voice of a generation" as a consequence of his music reflecting his personality and "the defining characteristics of his audience", with such recurring qualities of his discography corresponding "with those that his own generation, the millennials, most value: authenticity, realness, earnestness, sincerity". BBC Radio 1 executive George Ergatoudis has stated that his "lyrical candour" and his "professional hunger" resonated with younger listeners, giving him a "very clear edge" to breakthrough in a music industry that is "saturated with singer-songwriters", while Sheeran's "niche combination" has made him able to perform at hip-hop, grime and underground events and "convince the urban crowd that he was authentic". According to Vox, Sheeran has reached "global pop culture ubiquity". In 2017, the BBC named him the second-best performing artist of the decade, after Adele, while in 2021, The Independent said he had "one of the biggest pop careers of this generation". Billboard, The Financial Express, The Brandon Sun and Arab News have cited him as a "British music icon". In a 2023 poll conducted by the O_{2} Priority Tickets platform on what musical acts, past and present, music fans would most want to see live, Sheeran ranked third, after Queen and the Beatles. Sheeran and his work have influenced various recording artists, including Shawn Mendes, Louis Tomlinson, Camila Cabello and Cody Simpson.

== Accolades ==
On 19 October 2015, Sheeran received an honorary degree from the University of Suffolk in Ipswich for his "outstanding contribution to music". Sheeran commented: "Suffolk is very much where I call home. Receiving this recognition is a real privilege". He was appointed Member of the Order of the British Empire (MBE) in the 2017 Birthday Honours for "services to music and charity". Sheeran received the award from Prince Charles at Buckingham Palace on 7 December 2017. In 2012, he was named a baron of Sealand.

In addition to having the highest-grossing concert tour between 2017 and 2019, and being one of the world's best-selling music artists with 200 million records sold, Sheeran has received a number of awards. As of 2019, he has received four Grammy Awards (including Song of the Year in 2016 for "Thinking Out Loud"), five Brit Awards (including British Male Solo Artist in 2015), and six Billboard Music Awards (including Top Artist in 2018). In 2015 and 2018, he received the Ivor Novello Award for Songwriter of the Year from the British Academy of Songwriters, Composers, and Authors.

Although he regards Suffolk as home having moved to the county as a young child, Sheeran was recognised by his county of birth in a 2018 poll when he was ranked the fourth-greatest Yorkshireman ever behind Monty Python comedian Michael Palin, and actors Sean Bean and Patrick Stewart.

In 2024 he won a Primetime Creative Arts Emmy for Outstanding Original Music and Lyrics for "A Beautiful Game" from Ted Lasso.

== Personal life ==
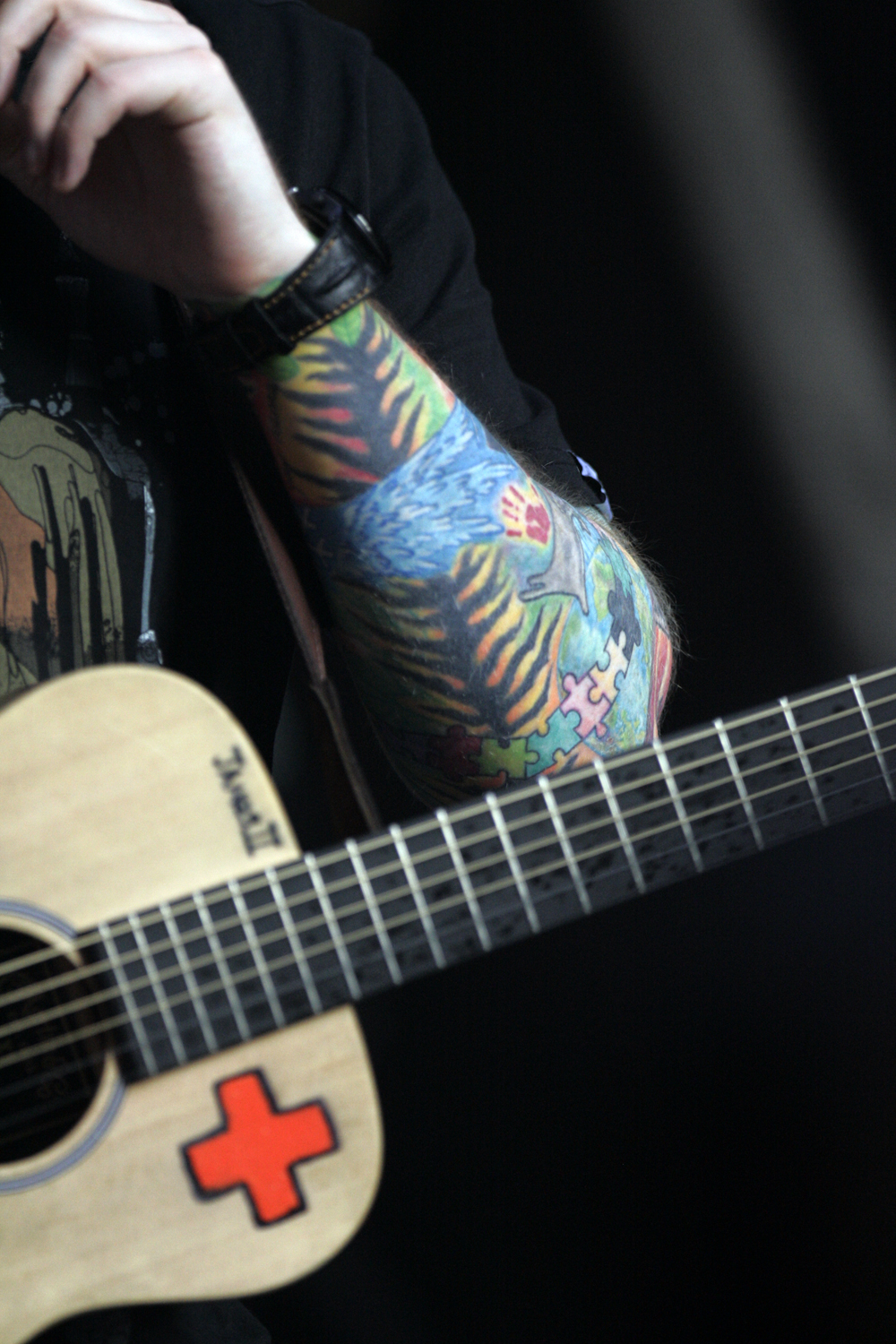
Many of Sheeran's tattoos are either connected to his family, achievements, or memories.

In early 2011, after securing recording and publishing deals, Sheeran purchased and renovated a farm near Framlingham, Suffolk, where he was raised. He said he hoped to raise a family there. This estate, which he has added buildings to over the years, has been nicknamed "Sheeranville" in the press. In 2013, he lived between Hendersonville, Tennessee and Los Angeles, California. In 2014, he bought a house in South London.

Sheeran was in a relationship with Scottish singer-songwriter Nina Nesbitt (who was in his music video for "Drunk") in 2012, before breaking up. Nesbitt is the subject of Sheeran's songs "Nina" and "Photograph", while most of Nesbitt's album Peroxide is about Sheeran. In 2014, Sheeran was in a relationship with Athina Andrelos, who works for chef Jamie Oliver. She is the inspiration of Sheeran's song "Thinking Out Loud". They broke up in February 2015.

In July 2015, Sheeran began a relationship with childhood friend and former secondary school classmate Cherry Seaborn. They announced their engagement in January 2018 and were married a year later. She is the inspiration of the song "Perfect". They have two daughters, born in 2020 and 2022.

He is close friends with singer-songwriter Taylor Swift; the pair collaborated on her albums Red (original and re-recorded versions) and Reputation, as well as on a remix of the song "The Joker and the Queen" from Sheeran's album =.

Sheeran is a supporter of his local football club Ipswich Town and of FC Barcelona. His +−=÷× Tour kit sponsored Ipswitch Town's 2021–22 until 2024–25 season. Additionally, Sheeran was named in the club's squad list and given the squad number of 17. In August 2024, Sheeran acquired a minority stake in the club, amounting to 1.4%.

In June 2015, Forbes listed his earnings at $57 million for the previous 12 months, and ranked him the 27th-highest-earning celebrity in the world. In July 2018, Forbes named Sheeran ninth on their list of the highest-paid celebrities. One of the wealthiest musicians, according to The Sunday Times Rich List of 2019, Sheeran was worth £160 million (US$207 million) as the 17th-richest musician in the UK. Sheeran's net worth was estimated at £300 million in 2023. In February 2026, Sheeran was listed at number 64 on the Sunday Times Tax List of the UK's 100 biggest taxpayers, paying an estimated £19.9 million in tax.

Sheeran has more than 60 tattoos, including designs dedicated to his family and a tattoo of a lion on his chest.

== Legal issues ==
Sheeran has faced accusations of plagiarism with regard to chord progression and other elements of his music. However, tort actions which have reached a jury have all been decided in Sheeran's favour.

In 2017, Sheeran settled out of court over claims his song "Photograph" was a "note-for-note" copy of the chorus in the song "Amazing" by The X Factor winner Matt Cardle. Sheeran later regretted the decision to settle, saying that it was done on the advice of his lawyers who thought the case was "more trouble than it was worth". He said he regretted settling the claim not because of the money involved, but because it changed his relationship with the song. He said: "I didn't play 'Photograph' for ages after that. I just stopped playing it. I felt weird about it, it kind of made me feel dirty". He also thought that settling the case opened a floodgate of claims, including the "Shape of You" lawsuit.

In 2018, legal action was brought against Sheeran, Sony/ATV Music Publishing and Atlantic Records by the estate and heirs of the late producer Ed Townsend, who co-wrote the song "Let's Get It On" with Marvin Gaye. US District Judge Louis Stanton rejected Sheeran's call in 2019 for dismissal of a legal case accusing him of copying parts of the song in "Thinking Out Loud". Stanton said that a jury should decide but that he found "substantial similarities between several of the two works' musical elements". A previous case by Townsend's estate was dismissed without prejudice in February 2017.

The case, closely followed by those in music and legal circles, went to trial in New York in April 2023. Sheeran's lawyers argued that while the two songs have similar "building blocks" and a specific chord progression, such features are true for many pop songs, and the jury found in favour of Sheeran with a unanimous verdict. After winning the trial, Sheeran said: "These chords are common building blocks which were used to create music long before 'Let's Get It On' was written and will be used to create music long after we are all gone". The legal battle continued for years, with appeals attempting to revive the case. However, in June 2025, the US Supreme Court declined to hear an appeal, effectively ending the dispute and upholding the previous rulings in Sheeran's favour.

Sheeran was taken also to court in March 2022 for a copyright lawsuit over "Shape of You". Musicians Sami Chokri and Ross O'Donoghue alleged that the song infringed "particular lines and phrases" of their 2015 composition "Oh Why". Sheeran won the case, with Mr Justice Zacaroli ruling he "neither deliberately nor subconsciously" copied a phrase from "Oh Why" when writing "Shape of You".

In August 2026, Sheeran pleaded guilty to failing to insure his 1966 Aston Martin while it was being restored and converted into an electric car. He was ordered to pay £1,032.

== Political views ==
In July 2017, when he was asked how he had voted in the June 2016 EU membership referendum, Sheeran said, "I don't get involved in politics. But I will say one thing: I was born a European and I fucking love being a European. You can probably guess my answer from that." After the British public voted for Brexit, Sheeran was among a group of British musicians, which included Sting, Queen's drummer Roger Taylor, Pink Floyd's drummer Nick Mason, Damon Albarn of Blur, Johnny Marr, Gorillaz, and others, who signed a letter to then-Prime Minister Theresa May, drafted by Bob Geldof in October 2018, calling for "a second vote". The letter stated that Brexit would "impact every aspect of the music industry. From touring to sales, to copyright legislation to royalty collation", adding: "We dominate the market and our bands, singers, musicians, writers, producers and engineers work all over Europe and the world and in turn, Europe and the world come to us. Why? Because we are brilliant at it ... [Our music] reaches out, all inclusive, and embraces anyone and everyone. And that truly is what Britain is".

In June 2017, Sheeran publicly endorsed the Labour Party and then-leader Jeremy Corbyn during the general election, while adding that "I'm not Mr. Political. I vote the way I feel I should, but won't tell somebody else what to do". Prior to the 2024 general election, Sheeran criticised the Conservative government for their lack of support for the arts, saying they believed the arts did not matter.

In 2021, Sheeran was one of over 300 other artists who signed an open letter, started by Jack Antonoff, urging the United States Congress to pass the proposed Equality Act, which would expand the Civil Rights Act in order to outlaw discrimination against LGBT people, which said the Act was "an essential part in protecting trans youth and all LGBTQ people by providing full protections to the most marginalized communities from discrimination".

In 2022, during the Russian invasion of Ukraine, Sheeran expressed support for Ukraine and participated in the fundraising event Concert for Ukraine, held at the Resorts World Arena in Birmingham, England in March of that year.

In March 2025, Sheeran wrote an open letter urging the UK government to protect and expand music education in schools, warning that decades of under-funding have made music opportunities increasingly unequal and at risk of disappearing from state education. They argued that music is vital for students' creativity, well-being, and future careers, and should not be treated as a luxury. In response, the UK government announced updates to the national curriculum, including reducing the EBacc performance measure to encourage a broader range of GCSE subjects such as music and the arts, as well as diversifying music education. Government officials and education leaders credited Sheeran's letter as influential in pushing these reforms and reaffirmed a commitment to making arts education accessible to all students.

=== Macklemore controversy ===
In September 2026, Macklemore was removed as an opener from the US leg of Sheeran's Loop Tour after he made "Free Palestine" statements on stage at the first two shows. Macklemore said Sheeran told him that Robert Kraft—who in 2019 was called Israel's most "loyal friend" by Israeli Prime Minister Benjamin Netanyahu—had called to say he would not be allowed to perform at Gillette Stadium, which is owned by the Kraft Group. According to Macklemore, Sheeran said "Kraft had rallied some of the other stadium owners and collectively they gave him an ultimatum: If Macklemore stays on the tour, you will not be allowed to play in our venues." Sheeran had performed at Kraft's wedding in October 2022.

In a post on Instagram, Sheeran said, "I am appalled by the conflict between Israel and Palestine. The suffering and pain caused on both sides is a human tragedy. There are too many wars across the world causing immeasurable pain, none of which should be tolerated." He added that Macklemore's removal was "the promoter's decision, it was not mine," referring to Messina Touring Group.

On 19 September, during a concert in Philadelphia—his first since his opening acts withdrew from the Loop Tour in solidarity with Macklemore—Sheeran addressed the audience regarding the controversy. He remarked that although he had never intended to be an activist musician, he found himself entangled in "the most complex political issue on the planet". He described the 7 October attacks in Israel and at the Nova music festival as horrific, stating that they "compounded centuries of Jewish pain". Concurrently, Sheeran characterized the military response and subsequent devastation in Gaza as "catastrophic and unjustifiable and disproportionate".

== Discography ==
- + (2011)
- × (2014)
- ÷ (2017)
- No.6 Collaborations Project (2019)
- = (2021)
- − (2023)
- Autumn Variations (2023)
- Play (2025)

== Tours ==
=== Headlining act ===
- + Tour (2011–13)
- × Tour (2014–15)
- ÷ Tour (2017–19)
- +−=÷× Tour (2022–25)
- − Tour (2023)
- Loop Tour (2026)

=== Opening act ===
- Example's Tour (2010)
- Snow Patrol's Fallen Empires Tour (North American select dates) (2012)
- Taylor Swift's The Red Tour (all North American dates) (2013)
- The Rolling Stones' Zip Code Tour (Kansas City only) (2015)

== Filmography ==
=== Film and television ===
Year	Title	Role	Notes	Ref(s)
2014	Shortland Street	Himself		
2015	Undateable	Himself		
2015	Home and Away	Teddy		
2015	Oh My English!	Himself	Cameo	
2015	The Bastard Executioner	Sir Cormac	5 episodes	
2015	Jumpers for Goalposts: Live at Wembley Stadium	Himself	Concert film	
2016	Bridget Jones's Baby	Himself		
2016	Popstar: Never Stop Never Stopping	Himself	Uncredited	
2017	Game of Thrones	Eddie	Episode: "Dragonstone"	
2018	The Simpsons	Brendan (voice)	Episode: "Haw-Haw Land"	
2018	Songwriter	Himself	Documentary	
2019	Yesterday	Himself		
2019	Modern Love	Mick	Episode: "Hers was a World of One"	
2019	Star Wars: The Rise of Skywalker	Alien	Uncredited cameo	
2021	Red Notice	Himself	Cameo	
2023	The Sum of It All	Himself	Docuseries	
2023	Sumotherhood	Crack Ed		
2024	Andrea Bocelli 30: The Celebration	Himself	Television special	
2025	Stans	Himself	Documentary	
2025	One Shot with Ed Sheeran	Himself	Netflix special	
2025	Zootopia 2	Ed Shearin (voice)	Cameo	
2026	Solo Mio	Himself	Cameo	

=== Commercials ===
Year	Product(s)	Brand(s)	Role	Ref
2014	Solo2	Beats by Dr. Dre	Himself	
2019	"Edchup"	Heinz	Himself	

== See also ==
- List of Official Subscription Plays Chart number-one songs of the 2010s
- List of highest-grossing live music artists
- List of most-viewed Instagram reels
- List of YouTubers
- List of most-subscribed YouTube channels
