= Christina Johnston =

English soprano

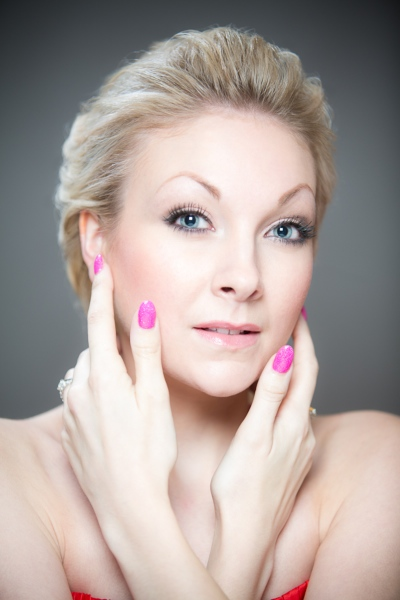
- Johnston, c. 2017
- Born: Framlingham, Suffolk, England
- Education: Guildhall School of Music and Drama
- Occupation: Coloratura soprano
- Years active: 2012–present
- Style: Classical; opera
- Website: www.christinajohnstonofficial.com

Christina Johnston

Christina Johnston is an English coloratura soprano. Born in Framlingham, Suffolk, she studied at the Guildhall School of Music and Drama before establishing an international career in opera, classical music and crossover repertoire. She made her operatic debut at the State Opera in Prague as the Queen of the Night in Mozart’s The Magic Flute and Adele in Johann Strauss II’s Die Fledermaus. She has subsequently performed in Europe, Asia and South America and has appeared as a soloist with orchestras and alongside artists including José Carreras and Russell Watson.

Recordings and performances

Johnston released her debut album, Blessing, in 2017. The album was recorded with the City of Prague Philharmonic Orchestra and Chorus and conducted by Richard Hein. It contains repertoire in several languages, including Mozart’s “Der Hölle Rache”.

Johnston has also recorded for film and television. Her performance of Mozart’s “Voi che sapete” appears in the soundtrack of the 2020 film Wonder Woman 1984, performed and arranged by Hybrid featuring Christina Johnston.

In 2022, Johnston recorded “A Million Tears”, a song associated with the Animal Purple Poppy Fund and International War Animal Remembrance Day. The recording reached number one on the iTunes Classical chart.

Johnston has performed with José Carreras, including at a 2019 concert at Kenwood House in London as part of Carreras’s farewell tour. She has also performed with Russell Watson and the Royal Philharmonic Concert Orchestra.

Her work has included performances for heads of state and at major international events, as well as concert appearances across Europe, Asia and South America and including The Vatican.

== Early life ==
Johnston was born in Framlingham, Suffolk. When she was three, she and her mother were involved in a serious car accident. Johnston spent several weeks in hospital and subsequently underwent further surgery. Her father, Peter, taught her piano and guitar and encouraged her to sing with him. He died unexpectedly when Johnston was eleven.

Johnston has spoken about the importance of faith and spirituality in her life and music. She has described music as a means of expressing hope, encouragement and joy and as a way of connecting with other people.

== Musical education ==
Johnston studied at the Guildhall School of Music and Drama in London after receiving a scholarship. She subsequently worked as a young artist at the National Theatre Opera in Prague.

In 2012 she made her operatic debut at the State Opera in Prague as the Queen of the Night in Mozart’s The Magic Flute and Adele in Johann Strauss II’s Die Fledermaus. She later performed the role of Zerlina in Mozart’s Don Giovanni at Prague’s Estates Theatre.

Her operatic repertoire has included Olympia in Offenbach’s The Tales of Hoffmann, Zerlina in Don Giovanni, Katerina Cavallieri in the stage production of Peter Shaffer’s Amadeus, and other soprano roles. Her performances have taken place in opera houses and concert venues in Europe and on international tours.

Johnston’s repertoire also extends beyond opera to classical crossover, musical theatre and popular music. She has described herself as valuing a wide range of musical styles and has performed repertoire from opera, classical music, film music and musical theatre.

Although renowned for her stage roles, Johnston says her initial ambition was to star in musical theatre. She cites Mozart as her favourite composer.

== Blessing ==
Having long desired to make a name for herself in England, Christina Johnston officially released her first album in September 2017. Entitled Blessing, it features recordings by the City of Prague Philharmonic Orchestra and Chorus. British producer James Fitzpatrick produced it for Tadlow Music. Reportedly, Johnston had dreamed of making a classical album since the age of 14. It has Johnston singing in nine different languages, including Occitan. The album was conducted by Richard Hein. It includes Mozart's "Der Holle Rache Kocht in Meinem Herzen", which has since become one of her regular items, as it allows her to sing notes in the sixth register. She then decided her ambition was to maximise the number of people for whom she sings. The album is currently ranked at 759,600th in CDs and vinyl and 33,050th in Symphonies, on Amazon's bestseller rank.

Although Johnston is principally known as a coloratura soprano, her repertoire encompasses opera, classical music, musical theatre, film music and other crossover genres. She has performed works associated with composers and artists from both the classical and popular music worlds.

Johnston has said that she enjoys performing for audiences with different musical tastes and considers the ability to move between musical genres an important part of her work as a performer.

== Current life ==
Christina is married to Viacheslav Myachin, who is credited as executive producer on the Blessing album, along with Janet Fitzpatrick. Myachin, originally from Russia, moved to Prague to work for his family's furniture business, where Johnston joined him. In the year 2019, they began the process of relocating to the UK. Johnston's mother Gillian continues to live in Suffolk.

During the pandemic, Johnston performed a series of "lockdown" concerts from her home in Suffolk. Those performed most recently have included Johnston's selected vocal renditions of tracks from Evita, Moulin Rouge, The Greatest Showman, and Phantom of the Opera. These appear on Johnston's Facebook page and on her YouTube channel.
