= John Stock =

John or Jon Stock may refer to:

- John Stock (teacher) (1764–1842)
- Jon Stock (born 1966), British writer
- John Stock (American football) (born 1933), American football player
- John Stock (bishop) (1918–1972), Ukrainian Catholic bishop in the United States

== See also ==
- John Stocks (disambiguation)
