= Frederick Bird =

English cricketer

Personal information
- Full name: Frederick Nash Bird
- Born: 13 December 1875; Framlingham, Suffolk, England
- Died: 3 March 1965 (aged 89); Chichester, Sussex, England
- Batting: Right-handed
- Bowling: Right-arm medium

Domestic team information
- Years: Team
- 1920–1925: Devon
- 1910–1914: Suffolk
- 1908–1909: Northamptonshire
- 1899–1900: Gloucestershire
- 1896–1907: Buckinghamshire

Career statistics
Competition	First-class
Matches	16
Runs scored	398
Batting average	16.58
100s/50s	–/1
Top score	61*
Balls bowled	–
Wickets	–
Bowling average	–
5 wickets in innings	–
10 wickets in match	–
Best bowling	–
Catches/stumpings	11/–
- Source: Cricinfo, 17 April 2011

Rev. Frederick Nash Bird (13 December 1875 – 3 March 1965) was an English cricketer. Bird was a right-handed batsman who bowled right-arm medium pace. He was born in Framlingham, Suffolk.

Bird first played county cricket for Buckinghamshire, making his debut for the county in the 1896 Minor Counties Championship against Hertfordshire. He continued to play Minor counties cricket for Buckinghamshire until 1907, in which time he made 46 appearances for the county. It was in 1899 that he made his first-class debut for Gloucestershire against Warwickshire in the County Championship. He played first-class cricket for Warwickshire on six occasions, five in 1900 and once in 1901. His time playing Minor counties cricket for Buckinghamshire ended in 1907, with Bird joining Northamptonshire the following season and making his debut for them against Surrey at The Oval. He played nine further first-class matches for Northamptonshire, spread over the 1908 and 1909 seasons. He had marginally more success with Northamptonshire, scoring 263 runs at a batting average of 17.53, with a single half century which was the only one in his first-class career. This only half century came against Leicestershire.

Bird later joined his home county of Suffolk, who he represented in the Minor Counties Championship from 1910 to 1914. Following the war he played for Devon in the same competition from 1920 to 1925. Outside of cricket he was a Reverend. He later died in Chichester, Sussex on 3 March 1965.
