= Thomas Mills High School =

Thomas Mills High School & Sixth Form

Location
- Saxtead Road; Framlingham; Woodbridge, Suffolk, IP13 9HE; England; 52.22824°N 1.32818°E

Information
- Type: Academy
- Motto: Temporis filia veritas (Truth is the daughter of time)
- Established: Predecessor: 1751
- Local authority: Suffolk
- Specialist: Arts and Languages
- Department for Education URN: 136782 Tables
- Head teacher: Philip John Hurst
- Gender: Co-educational
- Age: 11 to 18
- Houses: Pembroke, Arundel, Brotherton, Fitzroy, Hitcham, Mowbray.
- Colours: Yellow (Pembroke), Blue (Arundel), Coral (Brotherton), Green (Fitzroy), Purple (Hitcham), Red (Mowbray).
- Website: http://www.thomasmills.suffolk.sch.uk

Thomas Mills High School & Sixth Form is a co-educational secondary school and sixth form with academy status in Framlingham, Suffolk, England. The current headteacher is Philip J Hurst.

== History ==
The history of the school dates back to the beginning of the 18th century, when local Baptist philanthropist Thomas Mills stipulated within his will that money from his estate be used to "further the education of the children in Framlingham", and as such the Trustees of Mills' estate eventually established the first Mills School in 1751 on Brook Lane, Framlingham. The School was able to survive for one hundred and fifty years, during that time moving from Brook Lane to Double Street within the town. The School was then combined for several years, starting in 1878, with the Hitcham School in Framlingham, before becoming separate once again in the form of the Mills Grammar School at the turn of the century. The Hitcham School continuing also, eventually becoming the modern Sir Robert Hitcham Primary School in the town. Opening in 1902 as an independent Grammar school for all children ages 8–16 with a starting total of only twenty-five pupils, Mills Grammar School grew over the course of the 20th century, eventually submitting to local authority control in 1939, changing its age provision to 11–18 in 1945 and finally admitting boys to the school in the mid-Seventies.

By this time the traditional model of Grammar, Modern and Technical schools had fallen out of favour and local councils were encouraged to form all-admitting comprehensive schools for the purpose of secondary education. As a result of this Mills Grammar School was merged with Framlingham Modern School, established in 1937, beginning in 1976 under the supervision of the latter's Headmaster, Michael Brown. Brown became the first headmaster of the newly formed Thomas Mills High School, opened in 1979, on the site of the old Modern School using the existing buildings and facilities, many of which continue to be used today along with many more modern additions. The original charitable trust established by Mills in his will continues to this day in the form of the Mills Charity.

== Notable alumni ==
- Naomi Watts, actress
- Ed Sheeran, singer-songwriter
- Tom McRae, singer-songwriter
- Josh Webster, racing driver
- Jesse Quin, musician

== See also ==
- List of schools in Suffolk
