= John Leofric Stocks =

British philosopher

John Leofric Stocks DSO (26 October 1882 – 13 June 1937) was a British philosopher, president of the Aristotelian Society, and (briefly, in 1937) was Vice Chancellor of the University of Liverpool.

== Biography ==
Stocks was born the sixth of twelve children to John Edward Stocks, the vicar of Market Harborough, Leicestershire.

He was educated at Rugby School and Corpus Christi College, Oxford and graduated in 1903. In 1906, he was an elected fellow and tutor of St. John's College, Oxford. Except for war service, he remained there until 1924.

Stocks served in the British Army with the King's Royal Rifle Corps during the First World War, and he was awarded the Distinguished Service Order for gallantry at Beaucourt. In 1924, he was elected professor of philosophy at the University of Manchester, and, in 1936, he was appointed vice-chancellor of the University of Liverpool.

His professional philosophical interests were in Aristotelian studies and Epicureanism. He was president of the Aristotelian Society and edited the Leaders of Philosophy book series (Ernest Benn Ltd.).

== Personal life ==
He married Mary Danvers Brinton, who was later Baroness Stocks, with whom he had a son and two daughters. Stocks was also a versatile sportsman and played rugby, hockey and cricket.

He died on a visit to Swansea in 1937.

== Bibliography ==
=== Writings ===
- The Old Town Hall Library of Leicester (Corporation of Leicester, 1919). Joint authors: Cecil Deedes and J. E. Stocks.
- Aristotle's Definition of the Human Good (Blackwell, 1919)
- Patriotism and the Super-State (The Swarthmore Press and Harcourt, Brace & Howe, 1920; book series: International Relations Series)
- The Voice of the People (Wells Gardner, Darton & CO., Ltd., 1920)
- Aristotlelianism (Marshall Jones Company. 1925; book series: Our Debt to Greece and Rome)
- An Introduction to Philosophy (Ernest Benn Ltd., 1929: Benn's Sixpenny Library)
- The Limits of Purpose (1932)
- Time, Cause and Eternity (Macmillan, 1938)
- Reason and Intuition, and Other Essays (Oxford University Press, 1939)
- Morality and Purpose (Schocken Books, 1969; book series: Studies in Ethics and the Philosophy of Religion)

=== Translations ===
- De Caelo (Aristotle's On the Heavens) (Oxford University Press, 1922), commenced in conjunction with H B Wallis.
