= John Stocks (priest) =

English archdeacon of Leicester

The Venerable John Edward Stocks, MA (28 August 1843 – 29 August 1926) was Archdeacon of Leicester from 1899 to 1920.

Stocks was born in Leeds, educated at Christ Church, Oxford. and ordained in 1867. He was Chaplain at his old college from 1867 to 1871. He was Vicar of Market Harborough from 1871 to 1884 and of St Saviour’s Church, Leicester from 1884 to 1902; Rural Dean of Gartree from 1884 to 1891 and of Leicester from 1891 to 1899. He was an Honorary Canon of Peterborough Cathedral from 1893 to 1899; Rector of Misterton with Walcote from 1903 to 1914; and Prolocutor of the Lower House of Convocation, Canterbury from 1913 to 1918.

Stocks had twelve children, including John Leofric Stocks, British philosopher and briefly Vice Chancellor of the University of Liverpool.

== Notes ==
Church of England titles
Preceded by John Mitchinson	Archdeacon of Leicester; 1899–1920	Succeeded by Frederick Brodie MacNutt
