= Ed Sheeran discography =

Recordings by English singer-songwriter

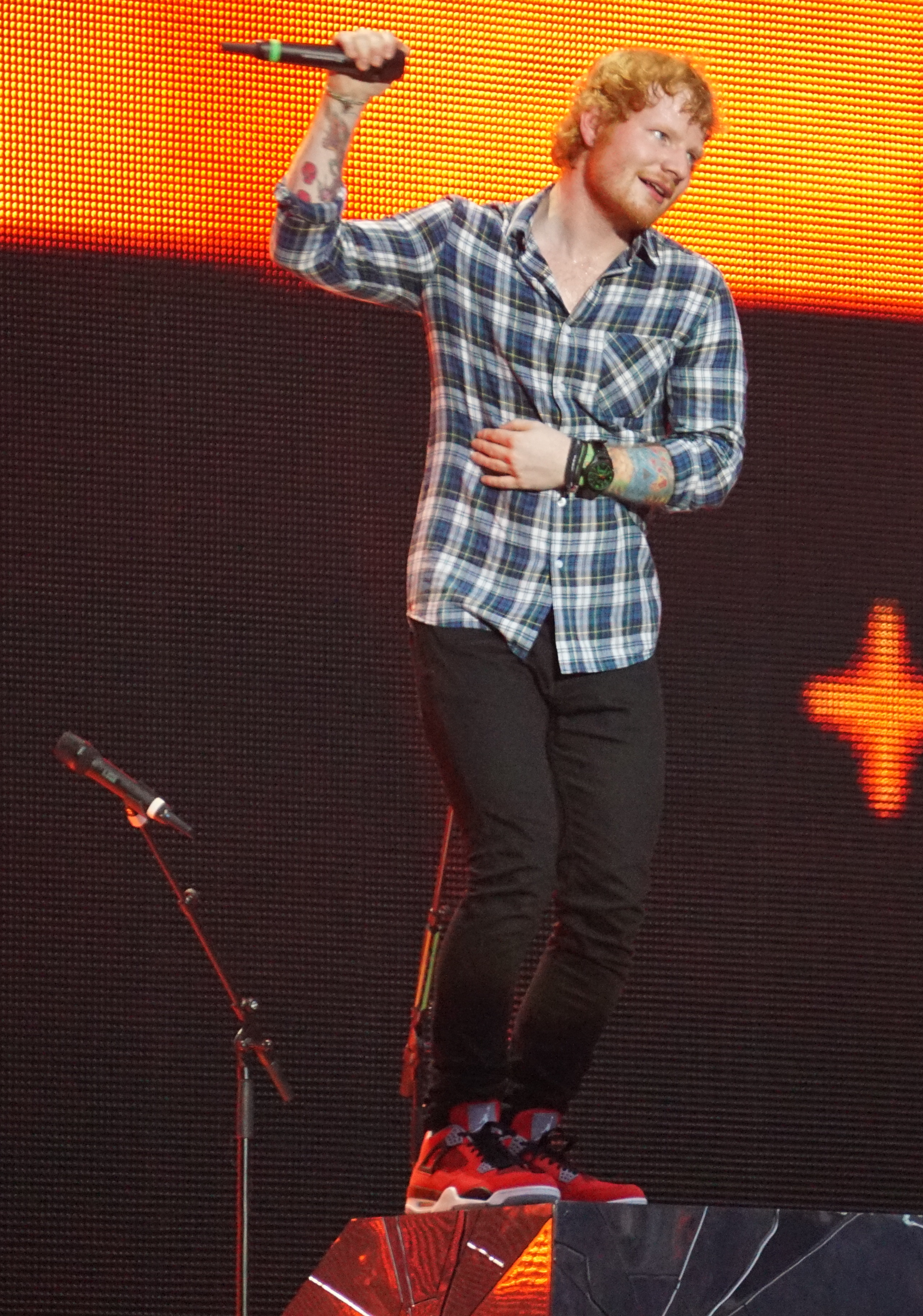
- Ed Sheeran performing at Wembley Stadium on the x Tour in July 2015
- Studio albums: 8
- Extended plays: 19
- Compilation albums: 2
- Singles: 39
- Video albums: 1
- Music videos: 71
- Promotional singles: 8
- Box sets: 1

The discography of English singer-songwriter Ed Sheeran consists of eight studio albums, two compilation albums, 17 extended plays, one video album, 65 singles (including 28 as a featured artist), eight promotional singles, one box set, and 71 music videos. Sheeran has sold in excess of 200 million records worldwide, making him one of the best-selling music artists in history. According to RIAA, Sheeran is the 15th best-selling digital singles artist in the United States with certified sales of 103 million.

Originally an indie artist selling music independently on his own label beginning in 2005, Sheeran released nine EPs, steadily gaining public and critical acclaim, resulting in his signing to Atlantic Records in January 2011. Five months later, Sheeran released his debut single, "The A Team", on 12 June 2011. It debuted at No. 3 on the UK Singles Chart with first-week sales of 57,607 copies. The track attained international chart success, reaching the top ten in numerous countries including Australia and New Zealand, where it peaked at No. 2 and No. 3 respectively. The release was succeeded by a second single, "You Need Me, I Don't Need You", in August 2011, which peaked at No. 4 in the United Kingdom. Sheeran released his major label debut studio album, +, on 9 September 2011. In its first week, + debuted at No. 1 on the UK Albums Chart, selling over 100,000 copies in its first week and was certified 7× Platinum by the British Phonographic Industry for sales of 2.1 million copies. The album spawned a further three singles, including "Lego House", which reached the top five in Australia, New Zealand and the UK. "Drunk" was released in February 2012, becoming Sheeran's fourth consecutive top ten single when it peaked at No. 9. "Small Bump" was released in May 2012, peaking at No. 25 in the UK. The final single from +, "Give Me Love", was released on 21 November 2012 and peaked at No. 18 in the UK.

In 2014, Sheeran released his second studio album, × (Multiply), which peaked at No. 1 in the UK, Ireland, the US, Australia, New Zealand, Canada, Germany, Finland, Denmark, Switzerland, and Norway. It was the fastest-selling album of 2014 in the UK, shifting 180,000 copies in its first week of release. Five singles were released from the album: "Sing", "Don't", "Thinking Out Loud", "Bloodstream" (a collaboration with Rudimental), and "Photograph". × was also the best-selling album of the year in the UK, with almost 1.7 million copies sold.

Sheeran released two singles, "Shape of You", "Castle on the Hill", his first solo material in two years, on 6 January 2017. His third studio album, ÷, followed on 3 March 2017. It debuted at No. 1 in 14 countries, including the UK, where it sold 672,000 units in its first week to become the fastest-selling album by a male solo artist there and the third-highest opening ever (behind Adele's 25 and Oasis' Be Here Now). It also topped the charts in the United States, Canada, and Australia. All the tracks on the album reached the top 20 of the UK Singles Chart in the week of the album's release, due mainly to heavy streaming. Sheeran also surpassed Calvin Harris' record of top 10 hits from one album. The next two singles, "Galway Girl" and "Perfect", both reached the summit in Ireland.

On 23 May 2019, Sheeran announced his fourth studio album, No.6 Collaborations Project through an Instagram post. The lead single, a collaboration with Justin Bieber titled "I Don't Care", was released on 10 May 2019. The album was released on 12 July 2019.

On 6 May 2021, it was announced that Sheeran became the new sponsor of the football shirt of Ipswich Town Football Club, and simultaneously revealed the title of his fifth studio album, =. His sixth studio album, −, was highly anticipated and released in May 2023. This was followed by his seventh studio album, Autumn Variations, in September 2023.

In August 2024, it was announced that Sheeran and Snow Patrol member Johnny McDaid would write and produce "Under the Tree", a song for the 2024 Netflix and Locksmith Animation film That Christmas.

His eighth studio album, Play, was released on 12 September 2025. It will be supported by the singles "Azizam", "Old Phone", and "Sapphire". He contributed the soundtrack of the 2025 sports drama film F1 with the single "Drive".

== Albums ==
=== Studio albums ===
Title	Details	Peak chart positions										Sales	Certifications
Title	Details	UK	AUS	CAN	DEN	FRA	GER	IRE	NZ	SWE	US	Sales	Certifications
+	Released: 9 September 2011; Labels: Atlantic, Asylum; Format: CD, digital download, vinyl, streaming	1	1	5	13	44	12	1	1	19	5	UK: 2,817,817 (Note: United Kingdom sales figures for + as of September 2025.); US: 1,210,000 (Note: United States sales figures for + as of March 2017.)	BPI: 9× Platinum; ARIA: 6× Platinum; BVMI: 3× Gold; GLF: Platinum; IFPI DEN: 3× Platinum; IRMA: 6× Platinum; MC: 5× Platinum; RIAA: 3× Platinum; RMNZ: 8× Platinum; SNEP: Gold
×	Released: 23 June 2014; Labels: Atlantic, Asylum; Format: CD, digital download, vinyl, streaming	1	1	1	1	5	1	1	1	1	1	UK: 4,025,007 (Note: United Kingdom sales figures for x as of December 2025.); CAN: 640,000 (Note: Canada sales figures for x as of June 2015.); FRA: 250,000 (Note: France sales figures for x as of April 2017.); US: 2,170,000 (Note: United States sales figures for x as of March 2017.)	BPI: 13× Platinum; ARIA: 10× Platinum; BVMI: 4× Platinum; GLF: Platinum; IFPI DEN: 11× Platinum; MC: Diamond; RIAA: 6× Platinum; RMNZ: 17× Platinum; SNEP: 2× Platinum
÷	Released: 3 March 2017; Labels: Atlantic, Asylum; Format: CD, cassette, digital download, vinyl, streaming	1	1	1	1	1	1	1	1	1	1	UK: 4,478,515 (Note: United Kingdom sales figures for ÷ as of December 2025.); FRA: 494,600; IRE: 21,300; US: 1,534,000 (Note: United States sales figures for ÷ as of January 2020.)	BPI: 15× Platinum; ARIA: 11× Platinum; BVMI: 5× Platinum; GLF: 2× Platinum; IFPI DEN: 14× Platinum; MC: Diamond; RIAA: 5× Platinum; RMNZ: 18× Platinum; SNEP: 2× Diamond
No.6 Collaborations Project	Released: 12 July 2019; Labels: Atlantic, Asylum; Format: CD, cassette, digital download, vinyl, streaming	1	1	1	2	2	2	1	1	1	1	UK: 1,097,605 (Note: United Kingdom sales figures for No.6 Collaborations Project as of September 2025.); FRA: 27,600; US: 251,000	BPI: 3× Platinum; ARIA: 2× Platinum; BVMI: Platinum; IFPI DEN: 3× Platinum; MC: 4× Platinum; RIAA: Platinum; RMNZ: 5× Platinum; SNEP: Platinum
=	Released: 29 October 2021; Labels: Atlantic, Asylum; Format: CD, cassette, digital download, vinyl, streaming	1	1	1	1	1	1	1	1	1	1	UK: 1,270,695 (Note: United Kingdom sales figures for Equals as of June 2026.); US: 230,000	BPI: 4× Platinum; ARIA: Platinum; BVMI: Platinum; IFPI DEN: 3× Platinum; MC: 7× Platinum; RIAA: Platinum; RMNZ: 4× Platinum; SNEP: 3× Platinum
−	Released: 5 May 2023; Labels: Atlantic, Asylum; Format: CD, cassette, digital download, vinyl, streaming	1	1	2	2	1	1	1	1	1	2	UK: 217,381 (Note: United Kingdom sales figures for − as of September 2025.); US: 110,000	BPI: Gold; IFPI DEN: Gold; MC: Platinum; RMNZ: Platinum; SNEP: Gold
Autumn Variations	Released: 29 September 2023; Label: Gingerbread Man; Format: CD, cassette, digital download, vinyl, streaming	1	1	4	2	5	1	2	2	3	4	UK: 71,781 (Note: United Kingdom sales figures for Autumn Variations as of September 2025.); US: 46,500	BPI: Silver
Play	Released: 12 September 2025; Label: Gingerbread Man & Atlantic, Asylum; Format: CD, cassette, digital download, vinyl, streaming	1	1	6	2	3	1	1	1	3	5		BPI: Gold; IFPI DEN: Gold; RMNZ: Gold; SNEP: Gold

=== Video albums ===
Title	Details	Peak chart positions				
Title	Details	UK	AUS	FRA	GER	SWE
Jumpers for Goalposts: Live at Wembley Stadium^{[A]}	Released: 13 November 2015; Label: Atlantic; Format: Blu-ray	4	6	16	90	9

Notes

- A The table includes positions on the music video charts, except for Germany where Jumpers entered the albums chart.

=== Compilation albums ===
Title	Details	Peak chart positions							Certifications
Title	Details	UK	AUS	CAN	GER	IRE	NZ	US	Certifications
5	Released: 12 May 2015; Labels: Atlantic, Gingerbread Man; Format: CD, digital download, streaming	—	17	—	—	—	—	30	RMNZ: Platinum
+−=÷× (Tour Collection)	Released: 27 September 2024; Labels: Atlantic, Asylum; Format: CD, digital download, vinyl, streaming	1	4	9	7	3	1	17	BPI: 2× Platinum; MC: Diamond; RMNZ: 3× Platinum

== Extended plays ==
Title	Details	Peak chart positions			Certifications
Title	Details	UK	AUS	IRE	Certifications
The Orange Room	Released: 1 January 2005; Label: None (self released); Format: CD, digital download	—	—	—	
Ed Sheeran	Released: 22 March 2006; Label: None (self released); Format: CD, digital download	—	—	—	
Want Some?	Released: 29 June 2007; Label: None (self released); Format: CD, digital download	—	—	—	
You Need Me	Released: 2 November 2009; Label: None (self released); Format: CD, digital download	142	—	—	
Loose Change	Released: 7 February 2010; Label: None (self released); Format: CD, digital download	90	83	39	BPI: Gold
Songs I Wrote with Amy	Released: 18 April 2010; Label: None (self released); Format: CD, digital download	199	—	—	
Live at the Bedford	Released: 15 November 2010; Label: None (self released); Format: CD, digital download, DVD	—	—	—	
Spotify Session	Released: 2011; Label: Elektra; Format: Digital download, streaming	—	—	—	
No.5 Collaborations Project	Released: 9 January 2011; Label: None (self released); Format: CD, digital download	46	—	—	BPI: Silver
One Take	Released: 7 April 2011; Label: Atlantic; Format: Digital download	—	—	—	
iTunes Festival: London 2011	Released: 11 July 2011; Label: Atlantic; Format: Digital download	177	—	—	
Thank You	Released: 18 September 2011; Label: Atlantic; Format: Digital download	—	—	—	
The Slumdon Bridge (with Yelawolf)	Released: 14 February 2012; Label: Atlantic; Format: Digital download	—	—	—	
iTunes Festival: London 2012	Released: 15 September 2012; Label: Atlantic; Format: Digital download	191	—	—	
Live and in Session	Released: 11 August 2014; Label: Atlantic; Format: Digital download, streaming	—	—	—	
Deezer Session	Released: 18 August 2014; Label: Atlantic; Format: Streaming	—	—	—	
Spotify Singles	Released: 7 June 2017; Label: Atlantic; Format: Streaming	—	—	—	
"—" denotes an extended play that did not chart or was not released.

== Singles ==
=== As lead artist ===
==== 2010s ====
Title	Year	Peak chart positions										Certifications	Album
Title	Year	UK	AUS	CAN	DEN	FRA	GER	IRE	NZ	SWE	US	Certifications	Album
"The A Team"	2011	3	2	29	—	43	9	3	3	27	16	BPI: 6× Platinum; ARIA: 10× Platinum; BVMI: 2× Platinum; GLF: 2× Platinum; IFPI DEN: 3× Platinum; MC: 9× Platinum; RIAA: 7× Platinum; RMNZ: 6× Platinum	+
"You Need Me, I Don't Need You"	2011	4	74	—	—	—	—	19	—	—	—	BPI: Platinum; IFPI DEN: Gold; MC: Gold; RIAA: Gold; RMNZ: Gold	+
"Lego House"	2011	5	4	54	—	—	51	5	5	—	42	BPI: 4× Platinum; ARIA: 8× Platinum; GLF: Gold; IFPI DEN: 2× Platinum; MC: 3× Platinum; RIAA: 2× Platinum; RMNZ: 3× Platinum	+
"Drunk"	2012	9	9	—	—	—	—	7	23	—	—	BPI: Platinum; ARIA: 2× Platinum; IFPI DEN: Gold; MC: Platinum; RIAA: Gold; RMNZ: Platinum	+
"Small Bump"	2012	25	14	—	—	—	—	17	11	—	—	BPI: Platinum; ARIA: Platinum; IFPI DEN: Gold; MC: Platinum; RIAA: Gold; RMNZ: Platinum	+
"Give Me Love"	2012	18	9	94	—	—	71	10	12	—	— (Note: "Give Me Love" did not enter the Billboard Hot 100, but peaked at number 17 on the Bubbling Under Hot 100 chart.)	BPI: 2× Platinum; ARIA: 6× Platinum; IFPI DEN: Platinum; MC: 4× Platinum; RIAA: 2× Platinum; RMNZ: 2× Platinum	+
"I See Fire"	2013	13	10	21	3	72	2	8	1	1	— (Note: "I See Fire" did not enter the Billboard Hot 100, but peaked at number 1 on the Bubbling Under Hot 100 Singles chart.)	BPI: 3× Platinum; ARIA: 2× Platinum; BVMI: 4× Platinum; GLF: 4× Platinum; IFPI DEN: 5× Platinum; MC: 3× Platinum; RIAA: Platinum; RMNZ: 6× Platinum	The Hobbit: The Desolation of Smaug
"Sing"	2014	1	1	4	15	5	7	1	1	22	13	BPI: 3× Platinum; ARIA: 3× Platinum; GLF: Platinum; BVMI: Gold; IFPI DEN: Platinum; MC: 4× Platinum; RIAA: 3× Platinum; RMNZ: 3× Platinum	×
"Don't"	2014	8	4	7	8	41	17	11	6	22	9	BPI: 3× Platinum; ARIA: 5× Platinum; BVMI: Platinum; GLF: Platinum; IFPI DEN: 2× Platinum; MC: 6× Platinum; RIAA: 5× Platinum; RMNZ: 4× Platinum	×
"Thinking Out Loud"	2014	1	1	2	1	4	6	1	1	2	2	BPI: 7× Platinum; ARIA: 13× Platinum; BVMI: 3× Gold; GLF: Platinum; IFPI DEN: 7× Platinum; MC: Diamond; RIAA: 18× Platinum; RMNZ: 12× Platinum; SNEP: Gold	×
"Bloodstream" (solo or with Rudimental)	2015	2	7	60	7	39	—	13	2	—	— (Note: "Bloodstream" did not enter the Billboard Hot 100, but peaked at number 10 on the Bubbling Under Hot 100 Singles chart.)	BPI: 3× Platinum; ARIA: 2× Platinum; IFPI DEN: Platinum; MC: Platinum; RIAA: Gold; RMNZ: 3× Platinum	×
"Photograph"	2015	15	9	4	8	9	4	3	8	20	10	BPI: 6× Platinum; ARIA: 9× Platinum; BVMI: 3× Platinum; GLF: Platinum; IFPI DEN: 5× Platinum; MC: Diamond; RIAA: 8× Platinum; RMNZ: 8× Platinum	×
"Castle on the Hill"	2017	2	2	2	2	3	2	2	2	2	6	BPI: 7× Platinum; ARIA: 9× Platinum; BVMI: 2× Platinum; GLF: 4× Platinum; IFPI DEN: 4× Platinum; MC: Diamond; RIAA: 4× Platinum; RMNZ: 8× Platinum; SNEP: Platinum	÷
"Shape of You"	2017	1	1	1	1	1	1	1	1	1	1	BPI: 11× Platinum; ARIA: 17× Platinum; BVMI: 6× Platinum; GLF: 9× Platinum; IFPI DEN: 9× Platinum; MC: 2× Diamond; RIAA: 13× Platinum; RMNZ: 14× Platinum; SNEP: Diamond	÷
"Galway Girl"	2017	2	2	16	2	15	5	1	3	3	53	BPI: 5× Platinum; ARIA: 8× Platinum; BVMI: Diamond; GLF: 3× Platinum; IFPI DEN: 4× Platinum; MC: 8× Platinum; RIAA: 2× Platinum; RMNZ: 6× Platinum; SNEP: Platinum	÷
"Perfect" (solo or with Beyoncé)	2017	1	1	1	1	1	1	1	1	1	1	BPI: 10× Platinum; ARIA: 16× Platinum; BVMI: 7× Gold; GLF: Platinum; IFPI DEN: 7× Platinum; MC: 2× Diamond; RIAA: 13× Platinum; RMNZ: 14× Platinum; SNEP: Diamond	÷
"Happier"	2018	6	16	22	11	73	16	5	11	9	59	BPI: 3× Platinum; ARIA: 6× Platinum; BVMI: Platinum; GLF: Platinum; IFPI DEN: 2× Platinum; MC: 7× Platinum; RIAA: 2× Platinum; RMNZ: 5× Platinum; SNEP: Diamond	÷
"I Don't Care" (with Justin Bieber)	2019	1	1	2	1	5	2	1	2	1	2	BPI: 5× Platinum; ARIA: 8× Platinum; BVMI: 2× Platinum; GLF: 3× Platinum; IFPI DEN: 2× Platinum; MC: Diamond; RIAA: 5× Platinum; RMNZ: 7× Platinum; SNEP: Diamond	No.6 Collaborations Project
"Cross Me" (featuring Chance the Rapper and PnB Rock)	2019	4	5	12	9	86	23	6	6	13	25	BPI: Platinum; ARIA: 3× Platinum; IFPI DEN: Platinum; MC: 3× Platinum; RIAA: Gold; RMNZ: 2× Platinum	No.6 Collaborations Project
"Beautiful People" (featuring Khalid)	2019	1	4	6	3	34	5	2	2	3	13	BPI: 3× Platinum; ARIA: 6× Platinum; BVMI: Platinum; IFPI DEN: 3× Platinum; MC: 8× Platinum; RIAA: Platinum; RMNZ: 5× Platinum; SNEP: Diamond	No.6 Collaborations Project
"Blow" (with Chris Stapleton and Bruno Mars)	2019	—	31	39	—	—	93	—	— (Note: "Blow" did not enter the NZ Top 40 Singles Chart, but peaked at number three on the NZ Hot Singles Chart.)	— (Note: "Blow" did not enter the Swedish Singellista Chart, but peaked at number nine on the Swedish Heatseeker Chart.)	60	BPI: Silver; MC: Platinum; RMNZ: Gold	No.6 Collaborations Project
"Best Part of Me" (featuring Yebba)	2019	—	17	44	35	162	55	—	13	41	99	BPI: Gold; IFPI DEN: Gold; MC: Platinum; RMNZ: Gold	No.6 Collaborations Project
"Antisocial" (with Travis Scott)	2019	—	11	17	8	102	23	—	9	21	37	BPI: Gold; ARIA: Gold; IFPI DEN: Gold; MC: Platinum; RIAA: Gold; RMNZ: Platinum	No.6 Collaborations Project
"South of the Border" (featuring Camila Cabello and Cardi B)	2019	4	12	14	18	75	33	6	14	14	49	BPI: Platinum; ARIA: 4× Platinum; BVMI: Gold; IFPI DEN: 2× Platinum; MC: 6× Platinum; RIAA: Gold; RMNZ: 4× Platinum; SNEP: Platinum	No.6 Collaborations Project
"Take Me Back to London" (featuring Stormzy)	2019	1	29	59	26	—	68	7	29	44	— (Note: "Take Me Back to London" did not enter the Billboard Hot 100, but peaked at number 16 on the Bubbling Under Hot 100 chart.)	BPI: 3× Platinum; IFPI DEN: Gold; MC: Platinum; RMNZ: Platinum	No.6 Collaborations Project
"—" denotes a single that did not chart or was not released.

==== 2020s ====
Title	Year	Peak chart positions										Certifications	Album
Title	Year	UK	AUS	CAN	DEN	FRA	GER	IRE	NZ	SWE	US	Certifications	Album
"Afterglow"	2020	2	7	10	27	129	10	2	12	13	29	BPI: Platinum; ARIA: Platinum; BVMI: Gold; IFPI DEN: Platinum; MC: 2× Platinum; RMNZ: 2× Platinum; SNEP: Gold	= (Note: "Afterglow" and "Peru" only appear on the tour edition of =.)
"Bad Habits"	2021	1	1	1	1	4	1	1	1	2	2	BPI: 7× Platinum; ARIA: 10× Platinum; BVMI: Diamond; IFPI DEN: 5× Platinum; MC: Diamond; RIAA: 3× Platinum; RMNZ: 8× Platinum; SNEP: Diamond	=
"Shivers"	2021	1	2	2	3	10	1	1	3	1	4	BPI: 5× Platinum; ARIA: 8× Platinum; BVMI: 2× Platinum; IFPI DEN: 4× Platinum; MC: Diamond; RIAA: 2× Platinum; RMNZ: 7× Platinum; SNEP: Diamond	=
"Overpass Graffiti"	2021	4	8	23	16	64	17	4	10	19	41	BPI: Platinum; BVMI: Gold; IFPI DEN: Gold; MC: Platinum; RMNZ: Platinum	=
"Merry Christmas" (with Elton John) (Note: "Merry Christmas" appears on the Christmas editions of = and of Elton John's thirty-second studio album, The Lockdown Sessions.)	2021	1	10	16	12	19	4	1	11	3	37	BPI: 2× Platinum; BVMI: Gold; IFPI DEN: Platinum; MC: Gold; RIAA: Gold; RMNZ: Platinum; SNEP: Gold	=
"Peru" (with Fireboy DML) (Note: "Peru" also appears on Fireboy DML's third studio album, Playboy.)	2021	2	—	37	—	28	—	7	— (Note: "Peru" did not enter the NZ Top 40 Singles Chart, but peaked at number three on the NZ Hot Singles Chart.)	35	53	BPI: 3× Platinum; IFPI DEN: Gold; RIAA: Platinum; RMNZ: Platinum; SNEP: Diamond	=
"The Joker and the Queen" (solo or featuring Taylor Swift)	2022	2	11	12	33	170	37	5	26	27	21	BPI: Gold; MC: Platinum; RMNZ: Gold	=
"Sigue" (with J Balvin)	2022	96	—	63	—	—	—	87	— (Note: "Sigue" did not enter the NZ Top 40 Singles Chart, but peaked at number 33 on the NZ Hot Singles Chart.)	99	89		Non-album singles
"Forever My Love" (with J Balvin)	2022	—	—	—	—	—	—	—	—	—	— (Note: "Forever My Love" did not enter the Billboard Hot 100, but peaked at number seven on the Bubbling Under Hot 100 chart.)		Non-album singles
"2step" (solo or featuring Lil Baby)	2022	9	40	21	11	35	41	9	— (Note: "2step" did not enter the NZ Top 40 Singles Chart, but peaked at number four on the NZ Hot Singles Chart.)	1	48	BPI: Platinum; GLF: Platinum; IFPI DEN: Gold; MC: 2× Platinum; RMNZ: Platinum; SNEP: Platinum	=
"Are You Entertained" (with Russ)	2022	47	45	41	―	—	―	43	20	52	97		Non-album single
"Noche de Novela" (with Paulo Londra)	2022	—	—	—	—	—	—	—	—	—	—		Back to the Game
"My G" (with Aitch)	2022	6	—	—	—	—	—	32	— (Note: "My G" did not enter the NZ Top 40 Singles Chart, but peaked at number 15 on the NZ Hot Singles Chart.)	—	—	BPI: Gold	Close to Home
"Groundwork" (with Big Narstie and Papoose)	2022	—	—	—	—	—	—	—	— (Note: "Groundwork" did not enter the NZ Top 40 Singles Chart, but peaked at number 33 on the NZ Hot Singles Chart.)	—	—		Non-album singles
"Celestial"	2022	6	35	63	34	73	46	23	— (Note: "Celestial" did not enter the NZ Top 40 Singles Chart, but peaked at number three on the NZ Hot Singles Chart.)	27	— (Note: "Celestial" did not enter the Billboard Hot 100, but peaked at number six on the Bubbling Under Hot 100 chart.)	BPI: Platinum; IFPI DEN: Gold; RMNZ: Platinum; SNEP: Platinum	Non-album singles
"F64"	2023	50	—	—	—	—	—	64	— (Note: "F64" did not enter the NZ Top 40 Singles Chart, but peaked at number five on the NZ Hot Singles Chart.)	65	—		Non-album singles
"Eyes Closed"	2023	1	6	4	8	32	13	4	10	10	19	BPI: Platinum; ARIA: Platinum; GLF: Platinum; IFPI DEN: Platinum; MC: 2× Platinum; RMNZ: Platinum; SNEP: Platinum	−
"Boat"	2023	15	48	71	—	—	—	21	23	69	— (Note: "Boat" did not enter the Billboard Hot 100, but peaked at number 20 on the Bubbling Under Hot 100 chart.)		−
"Life Goes On" (solo or featuring Luke Combs)	2023	29	23	27	—	—	—	19	33	— (Note: "Life Goes On" did not enter the Swedish Singellista Chart, but peaked at number 15 on the Swedish Heatseeker Chart.)	66	BPI: Silver; ARIA: Platinum; MC: Platinum; RMNZ: Platinum	−
"A Beautiful Game"	2023	—	—	—	—	—	—	—	—	—	—		Non-album single
"American Town"	2023	27	86	—	—	—	—	46	— (Note: "American Town" did not enter the NZ Top 40 Singles Chart, but peaked at number two on the NZ Hot Singles Chart.)	25	— (Note: "American Town" did not enter the Billboard Hot 100, but peaked at number 10 on the Bubbling Under Hot 100 chart.)		Autumn Variations
"The Great British Bar Off" (with Devlin)	2023	—	—	—	—	—	—	—	—	—	—		Non-album singles
"Under the Tree"	2024	55	—	85	—	—	40	73	— (Note: "Under the Tree" did not enter the NZ Top 40 Singles Chart, but peaked at number 11 on the NZ Hot Singles Chart.)	44	—		Non-album singles
"Azizam"	2025	3	20	12	9	23	6	13	26	7	28	BPI: Platinum; ARIA: 2× Platinum; BVMI: Gold; IFPI DEN: Platinum; MC: Platinum; RIAA: Gold; RMNZ: Platinum; SNEP: Diamond	Play
"Old Phone"	2025	17	—	60	—	—	—	38	— (Note: "Old Phone" did not enter the NZ Top 40 Singles Chart, but peaked at number 5 on the NZ Hot Singles Chart.)	62	89	BPI: Silver	Play
"Sapphire"	2025	5	21	30	20	65	16	20	16	30	74	BPI: Platinum; ARIA: Platinum; IFPI DEN: Gold; MC: Platinum; RMNZ: Platinum; SNEP: Platinum	Play
"Drive"	2025	49	—	—	—	—	—	—	— (Note: "Drive" did not enter the NZ Top 40 Singles Chart, but peaked at number 17 on the NZ Hot Singles Chart.)	—	—		F1 the Album
"A Little More"	2025	18	95	79	—	—	65	51	— (Note: "A Little More" did not enter the NZ Top 40 Singles Chart, but peaked at number 1 on the NZ Hot Singles Chart.)	61	— (Note: "A Little More" did not enter the Billboard Hot 100, but peaked at number 7 on the Bubbling Under Hot 100 chart.)	RMNZ: Gold	Play
"Camera"	2025	16	97	36	—	—	54	53	33	42	58	BPI: Silver; ARIA: Gold	Play
"Symmetry" (solo or featuring Karan Aujla)	2025	75	—	84	—	—	—	—	— (Note: "Symmetry" did not enter the NZ Top 40 Singles Chart, but peaked at number 11 on the NZ Hot Singles Chart.)	—	—		Play
"Repeat It" (with Martin Garrix)	2026	85	— (Note: "Repeat It" did not enter the Australian Singles Chart but peaked at number 12 on the ARIA Top 20 Dance Singles Chart.)	93	—	—	—	—	— (Note: "Repeat It" did not enter the NZ Top 40 Singles Chart, but peaked at number 16 on the NZ Hot Singles Chart.)	—	—		Non-album single
"—" denotes a single that did not chart or was not released.

=== As featured artist ===
List of singles as featured artist, with year released, selected chart positions, certifications, and album details shown
Title	Year	Peak chart positions										Certifications	Album
Title	Year	UK	AUS	CAN	DEN	FRA	GER	IRE	NZ	SWE	US	Certifications	Album
"Raise 'Em Up" (Alonestar featuring Ed Sheeran)	2010	—	—	—	—	—	—	—	—	—	—		Non-album single
"If I Could" (Wiley featuring Ed Sheeran)	2011	—	—	—	—	—	—	—	—	—	—		Chill Out Zone
"Young Guns" (Lewi White featuring Ed Sheeran, Yasmin, Griminal and Devlin)	2011	86	—	—	—	—	—	—	—	—	—		Non-album single
"Teardrop" (as part of the Collective) (Note: Massive Attack cover)	2011	24	—	—	—	—	—	—	—	—	—		We Are the Collective
"Hush Little Baby" (Wretch 32 featuring Ed Sheeran)	2012	35	—	—	—	—	—	72	—	—	—		Black and White
"Dreamers" (Rizzle Kicks featuring Pharoahe Monch, Hines, Professor Green, Ed Sheeran, Foreign Beggars and Chali 2na)	2012	—	—	—	—	—	—	—	—	—	—		Stereo Typical
"Watchtower" (Devlin featuring Ed Sheeran)	2012	7	—	—	—	175	—	73	—	—	—	BPI: Silver	A Moving Picture
"Wish You Were Here" (Ed Sheeran with Richard Jones, Nick Mason, Mike Rutherford and David Arnold)	2012	34	—	—	—	—	—	59	—	—	—		A Symphony of British Music
"All Falls Down" (Alonestar featuring Ed Sheeran and Rosie Ribbons)	2013	—	—	—	—	—	—	—	—	—	—		Warrior
"Everything Has Changed" (Taylor Swift featuring Ed Sheeran)	2013	7	28	28	—	—	—	5	22	—	32	BPI: Platinum; ARIA: 3× Platinum; RIAA: 2× Platinum; RMNZ: Platinum	Red
"Old School Love" (Lupe Fiasco featuring Ed Sheeran)	2013	—	23	100	—	—	—	—	17	—	93	ARIA: Platinum; RIAA: Gold; RMNZ: Gold	Non-album single
"All About It" (Hoodie Allen featuring Ed Sheeran)	2014	—	—	—	—	—	9	—	30	—	71	RIAA: Gold	People Keep Talking
"Lay It All on Me" (Rudimental featuring Ed Sheeran)	2015	12	7	29	26	—	31	5	5	17	48	BPI: Platinum; ARIA: 2× Platinum; BVMI: Gold; IFPI DEN: Platinum; MC: 2× Platinum; RIAA: Platinum; RMNZ: 3× Platinum	We the Generation
"Reuf" (Nekfeu featuring Ed Sheeran)	2015	—	—	—	—	72	—	—	—	—	—		Feu
"Boa Me" (Fuse ODG featuring Ed Sheeran and Mugeez)	2017	52	—	—	—	—	—	99	— (Note: "Boa Me" did not enter the NZ Top 40 Singles Chart, but peaked at number four on the NZ Heatseekers Singles Chart.)	—	—		African Nation
"End Game" (Taylor Swift featuring Ed Sheeran and Future)	2017	49	36	11	—	—	—	68	— (Note: "End Game" did not enter the NZ Top 40 Singles Chart, but peaked at number two on the NZ Heatseeker Singles Chart.)	—	18	BPI: Gold; ARIA: 3× Platinum; MC: Platinum; RIAA: Platinum; RMNZ: Platinum	Reputation
"River" (Eminem featuring Ed Sheeran)	2017	1	2	3	3	23	2	2	3	1	11	BPI: 3× Platinum; ARIA: 7× Platinum; BVMI: Gold; GLF: 2× Platinum; IFPI DEN: Platinum; MC: Platinum; RMNZ: 4× Platinum; SNEP: Platinum	Revival
"Amo Soltanto Te / This Is the Only Time" (Andrea Bocelli featuring Ed Sheeran)	2019	—	—	—	—	—	—	—	—	—	—		Sì
"Own It" (Stormzy featuring Ed Sheeran and Burna Boy)	2019	1	40	82	22	—	75	2	— (Note: "Own It" did not enter the NZ Top 40 Singles Chart, but peaked at number four on the NZ Hot Singles Chart.)	30	—	BPI: 3× Platinum; ARIA: Gold; IFPI DEN: Platinum; RMNZ: Platinum	Heavy Is the Head
"Sausage Rolls for Everyone" (LadBaby featuring Ed Sheeran and Elton John) (Note: "Merry Christmas" parody)	2021	1	48	―	―	—	―	41	— (Note: "Sausage Rolls for Everyone" did not enter the NZ Top 40 Singles Chart, but peaked at number seven on the NZ Hot Singles Chart.)	―	―		Non-album single
"Bam Bam" (Camila Cabello featuring Ed Sheeran)	2022	7	11	4	11	7	12	4	21	29	21	BPI: Platinum; ARIA: Platinum; IFPI DEN: Platinum; MC: 3× Platinum; RIAA: Platinum; RMNZ: Platinum; SNEP: Diamond	Familia
"Brace It" (Ishawna featuring Ed Sheeran)	2022	―	―	―	―	—	―	―	―	―	―		Non-album single
"For My Hand" (Burna Boy featuring Ed Sheeran)	2022	18	—	63	23	—	—	47	— (Note: "For My Hand" did not enter the NZ Top 40 Singles Chart, but peaked at number 15 on the NZ Hot Singles Chart.)	38	— (Note: "For My Hand" did not enter the Billboard Hot 100, but peaked at number 13 on the Bubbling Under Hot 100 chart.)	BPI: Platinum; ARIA: Gold; IFPI DEN: Gold; MC: 2× Platinum; RMNZ: Gold; SNEP: Gold	Love, Damini
"Lonely Lovers" (D-Block Europe featuring Ed Sheeran)	2022	—	—	—	—	—	—	—	— (Note: "Lonely Lovers" did not enter the NZ Top 40 Singles Chart, but peaked at number 35 on the NZ Hot Singles Chart.)	—	—		Lap 5
"Call on Me" (Vianney featuring Ed Sheeran)	2022	—	—	—	—	30	—	—	—	—	—	SNEP: Diamond	= (French edition)
"All Falls Down" (Dirty Pop featuring Ed Sheeran and Alonestar)	2023	—	—	—	—	—	—	—	— (Note: "All Falls Down" did not enter the NZ Top 40 Singles Chart, but peaked at number 32 on the NZ Hot Singles Chart.)	—	—		Non-album single
"Tu Mil Jaaye" (Arijit Singh, Sachin-Jigar, Madhubanti Bagchi, Ed Sheeran)	2026	—	—	—	—	—	—	—	—	—	—		King
"—" denotes a single that did not chart or was not released in that territory.

=== Promotional singles ===
List of promotional singles, with year released, selected chart positions, certifications, and album details shown
Title	Year	Peak chart positions										Certifications	Album
Title	Year	UK	AUS	CAN	DEN	FRA	GER	IRE	NZ	SWE	US	Certifications	Album
"All of the Stars"	2014	46	—	67	—	130	66	29	—	—	— (Note: "All of the Stars" did not enter the Billboard Hot 100, but peaked at number 13 on the Bubbling Under Hot 100 Singles chart.)	BPI: Gold; MC: Platinum; RIAA: Platinum; RMNZ: Gold	The Fault in Our Stars
"One"	2014	18	72	32	—	121	79	54	—	—	87	BPI: Platinum; IFPI DEN: Gold; MC: Platinum; RIAA: Gold; RMNZ: Platinum	×
"Afire Love"	2014	59	—	41	5	37	—	82	—	—	37	BPI: Gold; IFPI DEN: Gold; MC: Platinum; RIAA: Gold; RMNZ: Gold	×
"The Man"	2014	82	—	—	9	49	—	80	—	—	—	BPI: Silver; RMNZ: Gold	×
"Make It Rain"	2014	38	26	27	—	103	—	58	23	—	34	MC: Platinum; RMNZ: Gold	Sons of Anarchy Vol. 4
"Growing Up (Sloane's Song)" (Macklemore & Ryan Lewis featuring Ed Sheeran)	2015	—	—	—	—	—	—	—	—	—	—	RMNZ: Gold	This Unruly Mess I've Made
"How Would You Feel (Paean)"	2017	2	2	19	18	84	27	5	6	30	41	BPI: Platinum; ARIA: 2× Platinum; IFPI DEN: Platinum; MC: 2× Platinum; RIAA: Gold; RMNZ: 2× Platinum	÷
"Supermarket Flowers"	2018	8	19	31	26	109	29	9	16	39	75	BPI: 3× Platinum; ARIA: 4× Platinum; BVMI: Gold; IFPI DEN: Platinum; MC: 3× Platinum; RIAA: Platinum; RMNZ: 3× Platinum; SNEP: Gold	÷
"Visiting Hours"	2021	5	3	31	16	169	46	8	11	16	75	BPI: Platinum; ARIA: Gold; IFPI DEN: Gold; MC: Platinum; RMNZ: Platinum	=
"—" denotes a song that did not chart or was not released.

== Other charted and certified songs ==
List of non-single chart appearances, with year released, additional artist(s), selected chart positions, certifications, and album name(s) shown
Title	Year	Peak chart positions										Certifications	Album
Title	Year	UK	AUS	CAN	DEN	FRA	GER	IRE	NZ	SWE	US	Certifications	Album
"Little Bird"	2011	—	—	—	—	—	—	—	—	—	—	BPI: Silver; MC: Gold	Loose Change
"Gold Rush"	2011	81	—	—	—	—	—	97	—	—	—	BPI: Silver	+
"Autumn Leaves"	2011	84	—	—	—	—	—	—	—	—	—	BPI: Silver; MC: Gold; RIAA: Gold	+
"Kiss Me"	2011	—	—	—	—	—	—	94	29	—	— (Note: "Kiss Me" did not enter the Billboard Hot 100, but peaked at number 20 on the Bubbling Under Hot 100 Singles chart.)	BPI: Platinum; IFPI DEN: Gold; MC: 2× Platinum; RIAA: 2× Platinum; RMNZ: Platinum	+
"Grade 8"	2011	—	—	—	—	—	—	—	—	—	—	BPI: Silver	+
"This"	2011	—	—	—	—	—	—	—	—	—	—	BPI: Silver	+
"U.N.I."	2011	—	—	—	—	—	—	—	—	—	—	BPI: Silver	+
"Wake Me Up"	2011	—	—	—	—	—	—	—	—	—	—	BPI: Silver; MC: Gold	+
"I'm a Mess"	2014	49	—	—	—	—	—	62	—	60	—	BPI: Platinum; IFPI DEN: Platinum; MC: Platinum; RIAA: Gold; RMNZ: Platinum	×
"Tenerife Sea"	2014	62	—	—	—	—	—	53	—	—	—	BPI: Platinum; IFPI DEN: Platinum; MC: 2× Platinum; RIAA: Platinum; RMNZ: 2× Platinum	×
"Take It Back"	2014	85	—	—	—	—	—	—	—	—	—	BPI: Silver; RMNZ: Gold	×
"Nina"	2014	57	—	—	—	—	—	75	—	—	—	BPI: Gold; IFPI DEN: Gold; MC: Gold; RMNZ: Gold	×
"Runaway"	2014	71	—	—	—	—	—	—	—	—	—	BPI: Gold; MC: Gold; RIAA: Gold; RMNZ: Gold	×
"Even My Dad Does Sometimes"	2014	—	—	—	—	—	—	—	—	—	—	BPI: Silver	×
"Shirtsleeves"	2014	—	—	—	—	—	—	—	—	—	—	BPI: Silver	×
"I Will Take You Home"	2015	69	—	—	—	—	—	50	—	—	—		Bloodstream
"I Was Made for Loving You" (Tori Kelly featuring Ed Sheeran)	2015	—	—	64	—	—	—	—	21	—	— (Note: "I Was Made for Loving You" did not enter the Billboard Hot 100, but peaked at number 10 on the Bubbling Under Hot 100 Singles chart.)	BPI: Silver; RMNZ: 2× Platinum	Unbreakable Smile
"Dark Times" (The Weeknd featuring Ed Sheeran)	2015	92	—	—	—	—	—	73	—	60	91	BPI: Silver; RMNZ: Gold	Beauty Behind the Madness
"Touch and Go"	2015	—	100	—	—	—	—	—	—	—	—		× (Wembley Edition)
"Eraser"	2017	14	31	36	20	75	21	15	19	31	90	BPI: Platinum; IFPI DEN: Gold; MC: Platinum; RIAA: Gold; RMNZ: Platinum	÷
"Dive"	2017	8	5	19	13	67	23	11	4	28	49	BPI: 2× Platinum; ARIA: 3× Platinum; IFPI DEN: Platinum; MC: 3× Platinum; RIAA: Platinum; RMNZ: 4× Platinum	÷
"New Man"	2017	5	20	21	15	83	20	5	13	29	72	BPI: Platinum; ARIA: 2× Platinum; IFPI DEN: Gold; MC: Platinum; RIAA: Gold; RMNZ: Platinum	÷
"Hearts Don't Break Around Here"	2017	15	32	42	32	115	45	13	23	43	93	BPI: Platinum; IFPI DEN: Gold; MC: Platinum; RIAA: Gold; RMNZ: Platinum	÷
"What Do I Know?"	2017	9	24	26	25	98	35	8	14	25	83	BPI: Platinum; ARIA: 2× Platinum; IFPI DEN: Gold; MC: 2× Platinum; RIAA: Gold; RMNZ: 2× Platinum	÷
"Barcelona"	2017	12	36	45	33	129	42	10	26	48	96	BPI: Platinum; IFPI DEN: Gold; MC: Platinum; RIAA: Gold; RMNZ: Platinum	÷
"Bibia Be Ye Ye"	2017	18	39	57	—	130	52	14	29	56	— (Note: "Bibia Be Ye Ye" did not enter the Billboard Hot 100, but peaked at number 5 on the Bubbling Under Hot 100 Singles chart.)	BPI: Platinum; IFPI DEN: Gold; MC: Platinum; RIAA: Gold; RMNZ: Platinum	÷
"Nancy Mulligan"	2017	13	37	51	37	127	43	3	27	50	— (Note: "Nancy Mulligan" did not enter the Billboard Hot 100, but peaked at number 1 on the Bubbling Under Hot 100 Singles chart.)	BPI: Platinum; IFPI DEN: Gold; MC: Platinum; RIAA: Gold; RMNZ: Platinum	÷
"Save Myself"	2017	19	38	58	—	161	56	16	30	57	— (Note: "Save Myself" did not enter the Billboard Hot 100, but peaked at number 3 on the Bubbling Under Hot 100 Singles chart.)	BPI: Gold; IFPI DEN: Gold; MC: Platinum; RIAA: Gold; RMNZ: Platinum	÷
"...Baby One More Time" (Note: Britney Spears cover)	2017	—	—	—	—	—	—	—	— (Note: "... Baby One More Time" did not enter the NZ Top 40 Singles Chart, but peaked at number eight on the NZ Heatseeker Singles Chart.)	—	—		Spotify Singles
"Candle in the Wind" (Note: Elton John cover)	2018	—	—	—	—	—	—	—	— (Note: "Candle in the Wind" did not enter the NZ Top 40 Singles Chart, but peaked at number six on the NZ Heatseeker Singles Chart.)	— (Note: "Candle in the Wind" did not enter the Swedish Singellista Chart, but peaked at number nine on the Swedish Heatseeker Chart.)	—		Revamp: Reimagining the Songs of Elton John & Bernie Taupin
"Remember the Name" (featuring Eminem and 50 Cent)	2019	—	15	20	22	145	29	4	10	20	57	BPI: Gold; IFPI DEN: Gold; MC: Platinum; RMNZ: Platinum	No.6 Collaborations Project
"Feels" (featuring Young Thug and J Hus)	2019	—	54	77	—	—	—	—	—	— (Note: "Feels" did not enter the Swedish Singellista Chart, but peaked at number one on the Swedish Heatseeker Chart.)	—	BPI: Silver	No.6 Collaborations Project
"Put It All on Me" (featuring Ella Mai)	2019	—	48	71	—	—	—	—	—	— (Note: "Put It All on Me" did not enter the Swedish Singellista Chart, but peaked at number three on the Swedish Heatseeker Chart.)	— (Note: "Put It All on Me" did not enter the Billboard Hot 100, but peaked at number 22 on the Bubbling Under Hot 100 chart.)	BPI: Silver; MC: Gold; RMNZ: Gold	No.6 Collaborations Project
"Nothing on You" (featuring Paulo Londra and Dave)	2019	—	65	85	—	—	—	—	—	— (Note: "Nothing on You" did not enter the Swedish Singellista Chart, but peaked at number six on the Swedish Heatseeker Chart.)	—	BPI: Silver; MC: Gold	No.6 Collaborations Project
"1000 Nights" (featuring Meek Mill and A Boogie wit da Hoodie)	2019	—	56	65	—	—	—	—	—	— (Note: "1000 Nights" did not enter the Swedish Singellista Chart, but peaked at number eight on the Swedish Heatseeker Chart.)	—	MC: Gold	No.6 Collaborations Project
"I Don't Want Your Money" (featuring H.E.R.)	2019	—	64	100	—	—	—	—	—	— (Note: "I Don't Want Your Money" did not enter the Swedish Singellista Chart, but peaked at number 14 on the Swedish Heatseeker Chart.)	—		No.6 Collaborations Project
"Way to Break My Heart" (featuring Skrillex)	2019	—	50	79	—	—	—	—	—	73	—		No.6 Collaborations Project
"Those Kinda Nights" (Eminem featuring Ed Sheeran)	2020	12	25	22	29	115	—	20	30	20	31	BPI: Silver; ARIA: Gold; RIAA: Gold; RMNZ: Gold	Music to Be Murdered By
"Tides"	2021	— (Note: "Tides" did not enter the UK Singles Chart, but peaked at number 21 on the UK Streaming Chart.)	43	63	—	169	—	—	— (Note: "Tides" did not enter the NZ Top 40 Singles Chart, but peaked at number three on the NZ Hot Singles Chart.)	75	—	BPI: Silver	=
"First Times"	2021	— (Note: "First Times" did not enter the UK Singles Chart, but peaked at number 17 on the UK Streaming Chart.)	31	50	33	126	—	—	27	52	— (Note: "First Times" did not enter the Billboard Hot 100, but peaked at number 6 on the Bubbling Under Hot 100 chart.)	BPI: Silver; MC: Gold; RMNZ: Gold	=
"Leave Your Life"	2021	— (Note: "Leave Your Life" did not enter the UK Singles Chart, but peaked at number 30 on the UK Streaming Chart.)	67	82	—	—	—	—	—	95	—		=
"Collide"	2021	— (Note: "Collide" did not enter the UK Singles Chart, but peaked at number 28 on the UK Streaming Chart.)	65	79	—	—	—	—	—	100	—	BPI: Silver	=
"Stop the Rain"	2021	— (Note: "Stop the Rain" did not enter the UK Singles Chart, but peaked at number 35 on the UK Streaming Chart.)	69	83	—	—	—	—	—	89	—		=
"Love in Slow Motion"	2021	— (Note: "Love in Slow Motion" did not enter the UK Singles Chart, but peaked at number 36 on the UK Streaming Chart.)	74	85	—	—	—	—	—	— (Note: "Love in Slow Motion" did not enter the Swedish Singellista Chart, but peaked at number three on the Swedish Heatseeker Chart.)	—		=
"Sandman"	2021	— (Note: "Sandman" did not enter the UK Singles Chart, but peaked at number 51 on the UK Streaming Chart.)	98	—	—	—	—	—	—	— (Note: "Sandman" did not enter the Swedish Singellista Chart, but peaked at number 15 on the Swedish Heatseeker Chart.)	—		=
"Be Right Now"	2021	— (Note: "Be Right Now" did not enter the UK Singles Chart, but peaked at number 66 on the UK Streaming Chart.)	99	—	—	—	—	—	—	— (Note: "Be Right Now" did not enter the Swedish Singellista Chart, but peaked at number 18 on the Swedish Heatseeker Chart.)	—		=
"Everything Has Changed (Taylor's Version)" (Taylor Swift featuring Ed Sheeran)	2021	—	—	51	—	—	—	—	—	—	63	ARIA: Gold; RMNZ: Gold	Red (Taylor's Version)
"Run" (Taylor Swift featuring Ed Sheeran)	2021	—	19	28	—	—	—	—	—	—	47	ARIA: Gold; RMNZ: Gold	Red (Taylor's Version)
"One Life"	2022	—	—	—	—	—	—	—	— (Note: "One Life" did not enter the NZ Top 40 Singles Chart, but peaked at number 11 on the NZ Hot Singles Chart.)	89	—		=
"Who We Love" (with Sam Smith)	2023	85	—	—	—	—	—	70	— (Note: "Who We Love" did not enter the NZ Top 40 Singles Chart, but peaked at number 19 on the NZ Hot Singles Chart.)	— (Note: "Who We Love" did not enter the Swedish Singellista Chart, but peaked at number eight on the Swedish Heatseeker Chart.)	—		Gloria
"Salt Water"	2023	— (Note: "Salt Water" did not enter the UK Singles Chart, but peaked at number 66 on the UK Streaming Chart.)	—	—	—	—	—	—	36	—	—		−
"Dusty"	2023	— (Note: "Dusty" did not enter the UK Singles Chart, but peaked at number 100 on the UK Streaming Chart.)	—	—	—	—	—	—	—	—	—		−
"End of Youth"	2023	— (Note: "End of Youth" did not enter the UK Singles Chart, but peaked at number 75 on the UK Streaming Chart.)	100	—	—	—	—	—	—	—	—		−
"Curtains"	2023	16	24	61	—	—	87	23	25	40	97		−
"The Hills of Aberfeldy"	2023	—	—	—	—	—	—	—	—	— (Note: "The Hills of Aberfeldy" did not enter the Swedish Singellista Chart, but peaked at number 13 on the Swedish Heatseeker Chart.)	—		−
"Magical"	2023	49	—	—	—	—	—	95	— (Note: "Magical" did not enter the NZ Top 40 Singles Chart, but peaked at number 4 on the NZ Hot Singles Chart.)	— (Note: "Magical" did not enter the Swedish Singellista Chart, but peaked at number 18 on the Swedish Heatseeker Chart.)	—		Autumn Variations
"England"	2023	84	—	—	—	—	—	—	— (Note: "England" did not enter the NZ Top 40 Singles Chart, but peaked at number 7 on the NZ Hot Singles Chart.)	—	—		Autumn Variations
"Amazing"	2023	—	—	—	—	—	—	—	— (Note: "Amazing" did not enter the NZ Top 40 Singles Chart, but peaked at number 9 on the NZ Hot Singles Chart.)	—	—		Autumn Variations
"Opening"	2025	—	—	—	—	—	—	—	— (Note: "Opening" did not enter the NZ Top 40 Singles Chart, but peaked at number 7 on the NZ Hot Singles Chart.)	—	—		Play
"Regrets"	2025	— (Note: "Regrets" did not enter the UK Singles Chart, but peaked at number 92 on the UK Downloads Chart.)	—	—	—	—	—	—	—	—	—		Play
"Freedom"	2025	— (Note: "Freedom" did not enter the UK Singles Chart, but peaked at number 82 on the UK Downloads Chart.)	—	—	—	—	—	—	—	—	—		Play
"Skeletons"	2025	—	—	—	—	—	—	—	— (Note: "Skeletons" did not enter the NZ Top 40 Singles Chart, but peaked at number 6 on the NZ Hot Singles Chart.)	—	—		Play
"Sapphire" (featuring Arijit Singh)	2025	—	—	—	—	—	—	—	— (Note: "Sapphire" (featuring Arijit Singh) did not enter the NZ Top 40 Singles Chart, but peaked at number 6 on the NZ Hot Singles Chart.)	—	—		Play
"I Only Miss You" (Megan Moroney featuring Ed Sheeran)	2026	—	—	79	—	—	—	—	—	—	67		Cloud 9
"—" denotes a song that did not chart or was not released in that territory.

== Guest appearances ==
List of non-single guest appearances, with other performing artists, showing year released and album name
Title	Year	Lead and other artist(s)	Album
"Sleeping with My Memories"	2011	Mz. Bratt	Elements
"Pissed (With Pie)"	2012	Chris Moyles	The Difficult Second Album
"Charity Song"	2012	Chris Moyles, Davina McCall, Pixie Lott, Olly Murs, Gary Barlow, Danny O'Donoghue, Robbie Williams, James Corden, Ricky Wilson	The Difficult Second Album
"25 Tracks"	2012	Mikill Pane	You Guest It
"Heaven"	2012	David Stewart	Late Night Viewing
"Deepest Shame" (New Machine Remix)	2012	Plan B featuring Chip, Devlin, and Ed Sheeran	Deepest Shame
"Meanest Man"	2013	Labrinth, featuring Devlin, Wretch 32, ShezAr, and Ed Sheeran	Atomic
"Top Floor (Cabana)"	2013	Naughty Boy	Hotel Cabana
"Guiding Light"	2013	Foy Vance	Joy of Nothing
"Play It Loud"	2013	Giggs	When Will It Stop
"Back Someday"	2013	Sway	Wake Up
"Candle in the Wind"	2014	Elton John	Goodbye Yellow Brick Road: Revisited & Beyond
"Be My Forever"	2014	Christina Perri	Head or Heart
"Type of Shit I Hate/Interlude"	2014	Ty Dolla Sign, Fabolous, YG	$ign Language
"Dreams"	2015	Krept and Konan	The Long Way Home
"Reuf"	2015	Nekfeu	Feu
"Save It"	2015	Tory Lanez	Chixtape III
"Freakshow"	2015	DJ Mustard featuring the Game and Ed Sheeran	none
"Are You With Me?"	2016	Rockie Fresh	The Night I Went To...
"I Will Be There"(as Angelo Mysterioso)	2016	Eric Clapton	I Still Do
"Lifting You"	2017	N.E.R.D	No One Ever Really Dies
"Satellites"	2017	Kasey Chambers	Dragonfly
"This Year's Love" (Note: David Gray cover)	2017	None	BBC Radio 2: The Piano Room
"Hello Hi 2"	2018	Big Narstie	BDL Bipolar
"City of Sin"	2019	The Game	Born 2 Rap
"Roadside"	2019	The Game	Born 2 Rap
"Those Kinda Nights"	2020	Eminem	Music to Be Murdered By
"10,000 Tears"	2021	Ghetts	Conflict of interest
"My G"	2022	Aitch	Close To Home
"Lonely Lovers"	2022	D-Block Europe	Lap 5
"Who We Love"	2023	Sam Smith	Gloria
"Let Her Go"	2023	Passenger	All The Little Lights: (Anniversary Edition)
"Throw Your Arms Around Me" (Note: Hunters and Collectors cover)	2023	Various artists	Mushroom: Fifty Years of Making Noise (Reimagined)
"Drive"	2025	Promotional single	F1 the Album
"Yours Eternally"	2026	U2 featuring Ed Sheeran and Taras Topolia	Days of Ash

== Music videos ==
=== As lead artist ===
List of music videos as lead artist, with year released, featured artist(s), year, director(s) and reference (s) shown
Title	Year	Director(s)	Ref.
"Open Your Ears"	2006	None	
"Last Night"	2007	None	
"Let It Out"	2009	Sylvie Varnier	
"The A Team"	2010	Ruskin Kyle	
"You Need Me, I Don't Need You"	2011	Emil Nava	
"You Need Me, I Don't Need You" (featuring Wretch 32 and Devlin)	2011	Murray Cummings	
"You Need Me, I Don't Need You" (Rizzle Kicks Remix)	2011	TLoc	
"You Need Me, I Don't Need You" (True Tiger Remix featuring Dot Rotten and Scrufizzer)	2011	None	
"Lego House"	2011	Emil Nava	
"Drunk" (Official Fan Video)	2012	None	
"Drunk"	2012	Saman Kesh	
"Small Bump"	2012	Emil Nava	
"Give Me Love"	2012	Emil Nava	
"Give Me Love" (Live at Electric Picnic Festival)	2012	Simon O'Neill	
"I See Fire"	2013	None	
"One"	2014	None	
"All of the Stars"	2014	DJay Brawner	
"Sing"	2014	Emil Nava	
"Don't"	2014	Emil Nava	
"Thinking Out Loud"	2014	Emil Nava	
"Bloodstream" (with Rudimental)	2015	Emil Nava	
"Bloodstream" (Tour Video; with Rudimental)	2015	Ben Anderson	
"Photograph"	2015	Emil Nava	
"Castle on the Hill"	2017	George Belfield	
"Shape of You"	2017	Jason Koenig	
"Galway Girl"	2017	Jason Koenig	
"Bibia Be Ye Ye"	2017	Gyo Gyimah	
"Perfect"	2017	Jason Koenig	
"Perfect Symphony" (with Andrea Bocelli)	2017	Tiziano Fioriti	
"Happier"	2018	Emil Nava	
"I Don't Care" (with Justin Bieber)	2019	Emil Nava	
"Cross Me" (featuring Chance the Rapper and PnB Rock)	2019	Ryan Staake	
"Beautiful People" (featuring Khalid)	2019	Andy McLeod	
"Blow" (with Chris Stapleton and Bruno Mars)	2019	Bruno Mars	
"Antisocial" (with Travis Scott)	2019	Dave Meyers	
"Nothing On You" (featuring Paulo Londra and Dave)	2019	Cxrter Saint & Kamcordings	
"Take Me Back to London" (Sir Spyro Remix; featuring Stormzy, Jaykae, and Aitch)	2019	KC Locke	
"South of the Border" (featuring Camila Cabello and Cardi B)	2019	Jason Koenig	
"Put It All on Me" (featuring Ella Mai)	2019	Jason Koenig	
"Afterglow"	2020	Nic Minns and Zak Walters	
"Bad Habits"	2021	Dave Meyers	
"Bad Habits" (Official Performance Video)	2021	Dan Massie	
"Bad Habits" (Official Studio BTS)	2021	Nic Minns	
"Bad Habits (Fumez the Engineer Remix)" (featuring Tion Wayne and Central Cee)	2021	Jamal Edwards	
"Visiting Hours"	2021	Dan Massie	
"Shivers"	2021	Dave Meyers	
"Shivers" (Official Performance Video)	2021	Dan Massie	
"Overpass Graffiti"	2021	Jason Koenig	
"Merry Christmas" (with Elton John)	2021	Jason Koenig	
"The Joker and the Queen" (featuring Taylor Swift)	2022	Emil Nava	
"Forever My Love" (with J Balvin)	2022	José-Emilio Sagaró	
"Sigue" (with J Balvin)	2022	José-Emilio Sagaró	
"2step" (featuring Lil Baby)	2022	Henry Scholfield	
"Celestial"	2022	Yuichi Kodama	
"Eyes Closed"	2023	Mia Barnes	
"Boat"	2023	Mia Barnes	
"Salt Water"	2023	Mia Barnes	
"Life Goes On"	2023	Mia Barnes	
"Dusty"	2023	Mia Barnes	
"End of Youth"	2023	Mia Barnes	
"Colourblind"	2023	Mia Barnes	
"Curtains"	2023	Mia Barnes	
"Borderline"	2023	Mia Barnes	
"Spark"	2023	Mia Barnes	
"Vega"	2023	Mia Barnes	
"Sycamore"	2023	Mia Barnes	
"No Strings"	2023	Mia Barnes	
"The Hills of Aberfeldy"	2023	Mia Barnes	
"Under the Tree"	2024	Richard Curtis	
"Azizam"	2025	Liam Pethick	
"Azizam" (Concept Video)	2025	Saman Kesh	
"Old Phone"	2025	Emil Nava	
"Sapphire"	2025	Liam Pethick	
"Drive"	2025	Chris Villa	
"A Little More"	2025	Emil Nava	
"Camera"	2025	Emil Nava	
"Symmetry"	2025	Liam Pethick	

=== As featured artist ===
List of videos as featured artist, with artist(s), year released and director shown
Title	Artist(s)	Year	Director(s)	Ref.
"Young Guns"	Lewi White featuring Yasmin, Griminal, Devlin and Ed Sheeran	2011	Carly Cussen	
"Home"	Fugative, Sway	2011	None	
"Teardrop"	The Collective	2011	None	
"Suits"	Kasha Rae	2012	Dale Hooker	
"Hush Little Baby"	Wretch 32	2012	None	
"Watchtower"	Devlin	2012	Corin Hardy	
"Everything Has Changed"	Taylor Swift	2013	Philip Andelman	
"Old School Love"	Lupe Fiasco	2013	Coodie & Chike	
"All About It"	Hoodie Allen	2014	Jackson Adams	
"Do They Know It's Christmas?"	Band Aid 30	2014	None	
"Lay It All on Me"	Rudimental	2015	Emil Nava	
"Boa Me"	Fuse ODG, Mugeez	2017	Saieed Alam	
"End Game"	Taylor Swift featuring Ed Sheeran and Future	2018	Joseph Kahn	
"River"	Eminem	2018	Emil Nava	
"Freaky Friday"	Lil Dicky and Chris Brown	2018	Tony Yacenda	
"Because"	Boyzone	2018	Michael Baldwin	
"Own It"	Stormzy featuring Burna Boy and Ed Sheeran	2019	Nathan James Tettey	
"Sausage Rolls For Everyone"	LadBaby featuring Elton John and Ed Sheeran	2021	None	
"Peru"	Fireboy DML	2021	None	
"Bam Bam"	Camila Cabello	2022	Mia Barnes	
"For My Hand"	Burna Boy	2022	None	
"Are You Entertained"	Russ	2022	Jake Nava	
"Noche de Novela"	Paulo Londra	2022	Greg Davenport	
"My G"	Aitch	2022	Kelvin Jones	
"Groundwork"	Big Narstie, Papoose	2022	Kevin Hudson	

=== Guest appearance ===
Title	Artist(s)	Year	Director(s)	Ref.
"Off with their Heads"	Context	2011	George Musgrave	
"Oh My Way"	Joel Crouse	2020	Robbie Norris	

== Songwriting credits ==
List of songs written or co-written for other musicians, with year released, featured artist(s), album details, and reference(s) shown
Title	Year	Artist	Album	Ref.
"Love Shine Down"	2010	Olly Murs	Olly Murs	
"Only You"	2011	Iman	Non-album single	
"Moments"	2011	One Direction	Up All Night	
"Little Things"	2012	One Direction	Take Me Home	
"Over Again"	2012	One Direction	Take Me Home	
"Say You Love Me"	2014	Jessie Ware	Tough Love	
"18"	2014	One Direction	Four	
"Hotel Ceiling"	2015	Rixton	Let the Road	
"Tattoo"	2015	Hilary Duff	Breathe In. Breathe Out.	
"Love Yourself"	2015	Justin Bieber	Purpose	
"Cold Water" (featuring Justin Bieber and MØ)	2016	Major Lazer	Major Lazer Essentials	
"Pretty Woman"	2016	Robbie Williams	The Heavy Entertainment Show	
"When Christmas Comes Around"	2016	Matt Terry	Non-album single	
"Time Of Our Lives"	2017	James Blunt	The Afterlove	
"Make Me Better"	2017	James Blunt	The Afterlove	
"Don't Let Me Be Yours"	2017	Zara Larsson	So Good	
"Strip That Down" (featuring Quavo)	2017	Liam Payne	LP1	
"Your Song"	2017	Rita Ora	Phoenix	
"A Different Way" (featuring Lauv)	2017	DJ Snake	Non-album single	
"The Rest of Our Life" (with Faith Hill)	2017	Tim McGraw	The Rest of Our Life	
"Sam"	2017	Jessie Ware	Glasshouse	
"Can't See Straight"	2017	Jamie Lawson	Happy Accidents	
"Parallel Line"	2018	Keith Urban	Graffiti U	
"Trust Fund Baby"	2018	Why Don't We	8 Letters	
"Fallin' All In You"	2018	Shawn Mendes	Shawn Mendes	
"All on My Mind"	2018	Anderson East	Encore	
"Because"	2018	Boyzone	Thank You & Goodnight	
"Eastside" (with Halsey and Khalid)	2018	Benny Blanco	Friends Keep Secrets	
"2002"	2018	Anne Marie	Speak Your Mind	
"Thursday"	2018	Jess Glynne	Always In Between	
"Woman Like Me" (featuring Nicki Minaj)	2018	Little Mix	LM5	
"Moves" (featuring Snoop Dogg)	2018	Olly Murs	You Know I Know	
"Summer on You"	2018	PrettyMuch	Non-album single	
"Hello My Love"	2019	Westlife	Spectrum	
"Shine a Light"	2019	Bryan Adams	Shine a Light	
"Better Man"	2019	Westlife	Spectrum	
"Make It Right"	2019	BTS	Map of the Soul: Persona	
"Dynamite"	2019	Westlife	Spectrum	
"Stack It Up" (featuring A Boogie wit da Hoodie)	2019	Liam Payne	LP1	
"What Am I"	2019	Why Don't We	Non-album single	
"My Blood"	2019	Westlife	Spectrum	
"One Last Time"	2019	Westlife	Spectrum	
"Wild Fire Love"	2019	Hootie & the Blowfish	Imperfect Circle	
"On My Way"	2019	Joel Crouse	Non-album single	
"Tip of My Tongue"	2019	Kenny Chesney	Here and Now	
"Lazy Day" (featuring Danny Ocean)	2019	Fuse ODG	Non-album single	
"Still Learning"	2020	Halsey	Manic	
"Underdog"	2020	Alicia Keys	Alicia	
"Love and Hate"	2020	Kelsea Ballerini	Kelsea	
"Big" (featuring Gunna)	2021	Rita Ora, David Guetta, and Imanbek featuring Gunna	Bang	
"Love Songs Ain't for Us" (featuring Keith Urban)	2021	Amy Shark	Cry Forever	
"Renegades"	2021	One Ok Rock	Luxury Disease	
"Psycho"	2021	Maisie Peters	You Signed Up for This	
"Permission to Dance"	2021	BTS	Non-album single	
"Beautiful"	2021	Anne-Marie	Therapy	
"Eternal Love"	2021	JLS	2.0	
"Every Time"	2021	Ryan Keen	Non-album single	
"My Hero"	2021	Westlife	Wild Dreams	
"Pointless"	2022	Lewis Capaldi	Broken by Desire to Be Heavenly Sent	
"Who We Love" (with Ed Sheeran)	2023	Sam Smith	Gloria	
"Baby Don't Hurt Me"	2023	David Guetta, Anne-Marie, and Coi Leray	Non-album single	
"Chasing Stars"	2023	Matteo Bocelli	Matteo	
"World on Fire"	2023	Thirty Seconds to Mars	It's the End of the World but It's a Beautiful Day	
"Yes or No"	2023	Jung Kook	Golden	
"Living in Paradise"	2024	Bon Jovi	Forever	
"Forget About Us"	2024	Perrie	Perrie	
"Pushing Up Daises"	2025	Perrie	Perrie	
"Chariot"	2025	Westlife	25: The Ultimate Collection	
"Zoo"	2025	Shakira	Zootopia 2	
"Dai Dai"	2026	Shakira featuring Burna Boy	Official FIFA World Cup 2026 Album	
"Bottle Up"	2026	Backstreet Boys	Paw Patrol: The Dino Movie	
"Animal"	2026	Katseye	Wild	
