= List of number-one songs of 2022 (Panama) =

This is a list of the number-one songs of 2022 in Panama. The charts are published by Monitor Latino, based on airplay across radio stations in Panama using the Radio Tracking Data, LLC in real time, with its chart week running from Monday to Sunday.

In 2022, fifteen songs reached number one in Panama, with ten songs being collaborations; a sixteenth single, "Tacones Rojos" by Sebastián Yatra began its run at number one in November 2021. In fact, twenty-five acts topped the chart as either lead or featured artists, with thirteen—Ed Sheeran, Camilo, Rosalía, Natti Natasha, Maria Becerra, Los Legendarios, Chencho Corleone, Quevedo, Bizarrap, Emil, Ir Sais, Eix, Beéle and Maffio—achieving their first number-one single in Panama.

Karol G became the first artist in Panama to replace herself at number one as "Provenza" knocked off her collaboration with Becky G, "Mamiii". Maluma, Karol G and Emil are the only acts to have more than a number-one song in 2022, with two each.

== Chart history ==
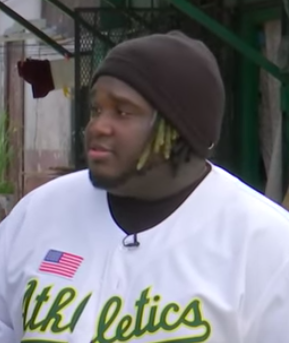
Panamanian singer Sech (pictured) earns his second number-one single with "Sal y Perrea".

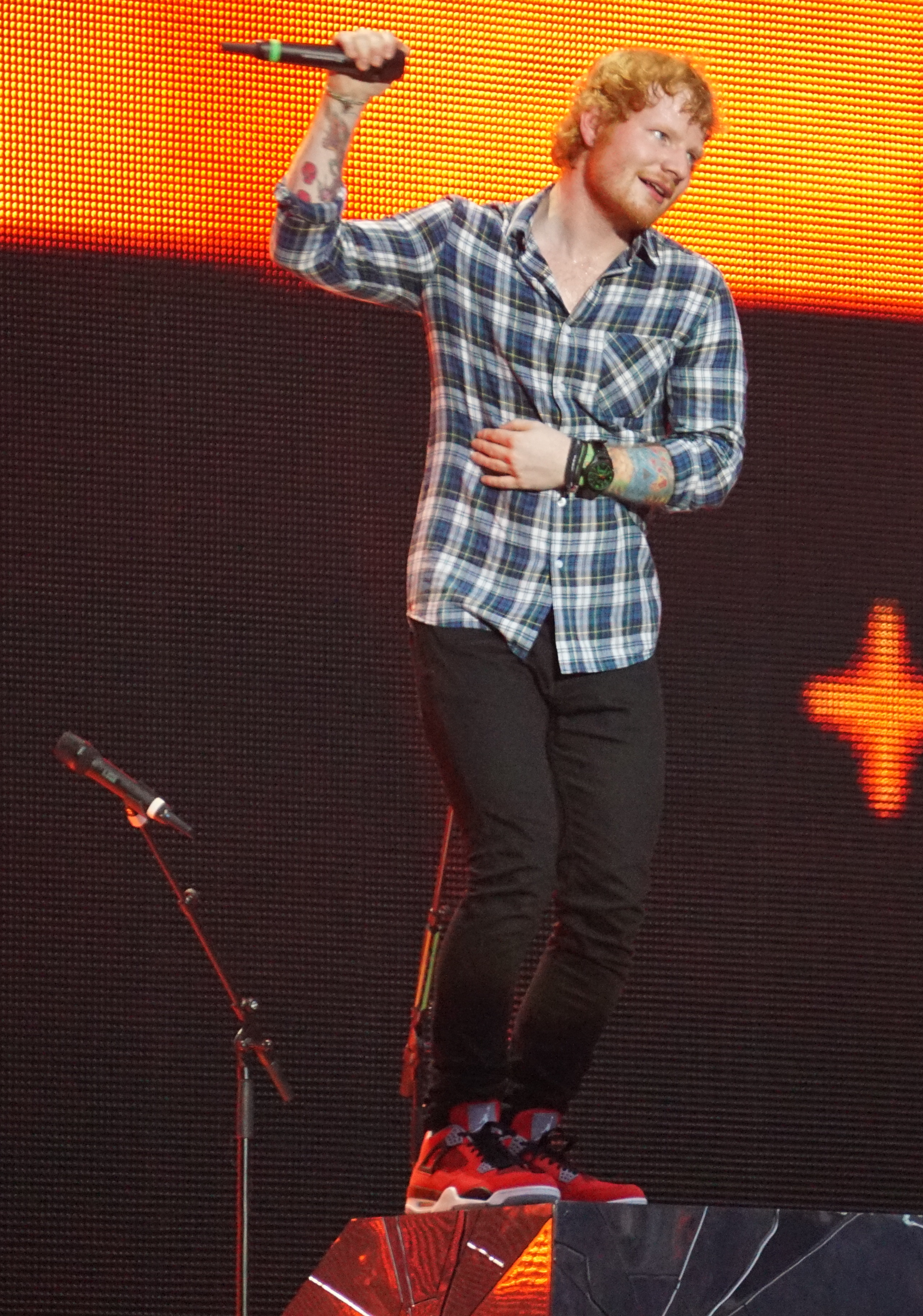
Ed Sheeran (pictured) earns his first number-one single with "Sigue".

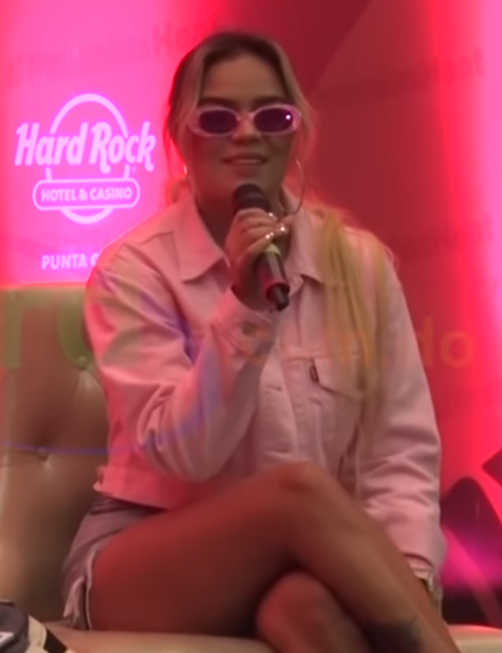
Colombian singer Karol G is the first artist to replace herself at number one in Panama.

Key
†	Indicates best-performing single of 2022

Issue date	Song	Artist	Reference
3 January	"Tacones Rojos" †	Sebastián Yatra	
10 January	"Sal y Perrea"	Sech	
17 January	"Tacones Rojos" †	Sebastián Yatra	
24 January	"Así No Vale"	Emil and Ir Sais	
31 January	"Party, Humo y Alcohol"	CNCO	
7 February	"Party, Humo y Alcohol"	CNCO	
14 February	"Party, Humo y Alcohol"	CNCO	
21 February	"Party, Humo y Alcohol"	CNCO	
28 February	"Party, Humo y Alcohol"	CNCO	
7 March	"Baloncito Viejo"	Carlos Vives and Camilo	
14 March	"Baloncito Viejo"	Carlos Vives and Camilo	
21 March	"Baloncito Viejo"	Carlos Vives and Camilo	
28 March	"Baloncito Viejo"	Carlos Vives and Camilo	
4 April	"Baloncito Viejo"	Carlos Vives and Camilo	
11 April	"Sigue"	J Balvin and Ed Sheeran	
18 April	"Mamiii"	Becky G and Karol G	
25 April	"Mamiii"	Becky G and Karol G	
2 May	"Mamiii"	Becky G and Karol G	
9 May	"Provenza"	Karol G	
16 May	"Te Espero"	Prince Royce and Maria Becerra	
23 May	"Te Espero"	Prince Royce and Maria Becerra	
30 May	"Te Espero"	Prince Royce and Maria Becerra	
6 June	"Te Espero"	Prince Royce and Maria Becerra	
13 June	"Nos Comemos Vivos"	Maluma and Chencho Corleone	
20 June	"Nos Comemos Vivos"	Maluma and Chencho Corleone	
27 June	"Nos Comemos Vivos"	Maluma and Chencho Corleone	
4 July	"Nos Comemos Vivos"	Maluma and Chencho Corleone	
11 July	"Cuando te Veo"	Eix, Beéle and Maffio	
18 July	"Cuando te Veo"	Eix, Beéle and Maffio	
25 July	"Inquieta"	Emil	
1 August	"Inquieta"	Emil	
8 August	"Inquieta"	Emil	
15 August	"Inquieta"	Emil	
22 August	"Despechá"	Rosalía	
29 August	"Despechá"	Rosalía	
5 September	"Tiempo"	Wisin, Natti Natasha and Los Legendarios	
12 September	"Tiempo"	Wisin, Natti Natasha and Los Legendarios	
19 September	"Tiempo"	Wisin, Natti Natasha and Los Legendarios	
26 September	"Tiempo"	Wisin, Natti Natasha and Los Legendarios	
3 October	"Quevedo: Bzrp Music Sessions, Vol. 52"	Bizarrap and Quevedo	
10 October	"Junio"	Maluma	
17 October	"Junio"	Maluma	
24 October	"Junio"	Maluma	
31 October	"Junio"	Maluma	
7 November	"Junio"	Maluma	
14 November	"Monotonía"	Shakira and Ozuna	
21 November	"Monotonía"	Shakira and Ozuna	
28 November	"Ulala"	Myke Towers and Daddy Yankee	
5 December	"Ulala"	Myke Towers and Daddy Yankee	
12 December	"Ulala"	Myke Towers and Daddy Yankee	
19 December	"Ulala"	Myke Towers and Daddy Yankee	
26 December	"Ulala"	Myke Towers and Daddy Yankee	

== Number-one artists ==
List of number-one artists by total weeks at number one
Position	Artist	Weeks at No. 1
1	Maluma	9
2	Camilo	5
2	Carlos Vives	5
2	CNCO	5
2	Daddy Yankee	5
2	Emil	5
2	Myke Towers	5
3	Chencho Corleone	4
3	Karol G	4
3	Los Legendarios	4
3	Maria Becerra	4
3	Natti Natasha	4
3	Prince Royce	4
3	Wisin	4
4	Becky G	3
5	Beéle	2
5	Eix	2
5	Maffio	2
5	Ozuna	2
5	Rosalía	2
5	Sebastián Yatra	2
5	Shakira	2
6	Bizarrap	1
6	Ed Sheeran	1
6	Ir Sais	1
6	J Balvin	1
6	Quevedo	1
6	Sech	1
