= Bakhmut Fortress =

Song by Antytila
- Language: Ukrainian
- Genre: Rock
- Length: 3:19
- Songwriter: Taras Topolya
- Composers: Serhiy Vusyk; Taras Topolya

"Bakhmut Fortress" (Ukrainian: Фортеця Бахмут, romanized: Fortetsia Bakhmut, pronounced [forˈtɛtsʲɐ bɐxˈmut]) is a song by the Ukrainian music group Antytila, dedicated to the city of Bakhmut, the Armed Forces of Ukraine and the entire Ukrainian people who resisted against the Russians during the Russian invasion of Ukraine. The composition was released to the general public on February 3, 2023.

With this song, the musicians aimed to strengthen the morale of the military defending Ukraine.

== Idea and creation ==
According to the musicians, the text of the song was written in just a day by Taras Topolya, and the music was composed by Serhiy Vusyk. Taras Topolya thus described the idea of creating a song:

As musicians, we understood that we needed to do something inspiring, with which we would want to tear the earth, go into battle, stand and not retreat. But as citizens who have combat experience, we understand that we need to do our work and our task calmly, as we were taught, and that behind our backs, behind the backs of those who are right now with weapons against the occupiers, is the future of Ukraine.

In the text, Taras refers to the heroic past of the Ukrainian people, in particular, the participants of the Battle of Kruty in 1918 are mentioned.

== Release ==
The band presented the song on February 3, 2023. Together with the song, the band presented a music video, which showed footage of the destroyed city of Bakhmut.

On February 10, the official music video was released, which the band "Antitila" filmed for 3 days in real positions during the execution of combat missions near Bakhmut during the Battle of Bakhmut. The basis of the future scenario was proposed by director Kadym Tarasov. The director was Viktor Skuratovskyi . The video shows a combat unit of the 59th howitzer artillery division of the 45th separate artillery brigade, which works with M777 howitzers. According to the authors, the idea of the video clip is that projectiles with quotes from the song written on them are launched by gunners in the direction of the enemy and destroy them with the words from the composition. Also, according to the musicians themselves, a car of the "Maestro" medical unit of the 130th Territorial Defense Battalion of the 241st Territorial Defense Brigade, which was used on combat missions by band members when they performed tasks in the war zone, appears in the frame.

On February 24, 2023, the musicians presented an acoustic version of this song and a video clip for it. The announcement was accompanied by the following post:

In memory of the fallen comrades of the 130th TRO battalion, 241st brigade of the Armed Forces of Ukraine in the war of liberation against the Russian occupiers. Dedicated to everyone who is on the shield and with the shield. Together with our unit, we performed this song in a new way. In the frame, the native 4th company and combat medics of the "Maestro" unit. In the acoustic version, our sorrow for our brothers and respect for them, as well as our determination to take revenge for every broken Ukrainian fate, are heard. The clip was filmed when the battalion was withdrawn from the front line in the Bakhmut direction for recovery. Eternal glory to the Heroes on the shield.

As of May 18, 2023, the official music video has amassed 12 million views on YouTube.
