= Frozen (Lil Baby song) =

2022 single by Lil Baby

Single by Lil Baby
- Released: April 29, 2022
- Recorded: 2021
- Genre: Trap
- Length: 2:59
- Label: Quality Control; Motown
- Songwriters: Dominique Jones; Anthony Phillips; Gabriel Kerr
- Producers: Ant Chamberlain; STG Beats

Lil Baby singles chronology
"2step" (2022)	"Frozen" (2022)	"Voodoo (Remix)" (2022)

"Frozen" is a song by American rapper Lil Baby, released on April 29, 2022 by Quality Control Music and Motown. It was produced by Ant Chamberlain and STG Beats.

== Background ==
The song leaked online on December 25, 2021. Subsequently, fans expected that it would be officially released. On April 29, 2022, Lil Baby released the song and announced it on Instagram, writing, "I Hate This Song Got Leaked But This Bitch So Hard I Still Dropped It".

== Composition ==
The song is built on a "melancholic" piano loop that is accompanied with "cymbal ticks and handclaps". Lyrically, it sees Lil Baby reflecting on his fame and success as a rapper, especially the aspects of which that bring stress to him, and singing about his determination to overcome them.

== Charts ==
Chart performance for "Frozen"
Chart (2022)	Peak position
Canada Hot 100 (Billboard)	78
Global 200 (Billboard)	99
US Billboard Hot 100	54
US Hot R&B/Hip-Hop Songs (Billboard)	25
