= Last Last =

2022 single by Burna Boy

Single by Burna Boy

from the album Love, Damini
- Released: 13 May 2022
- Genre: Afrobeats
- Length: 2:53
- Label: Atlantic
- Songwriters: Damini Ogulu; LaShawn Daniels; Harvey Mason Jr.; Fred Jerkins III; Rodney Jerkins; Mikael Haataja; Samuel Haataja; James Olagundoye; Santeri Kauppinen; Robert Laukkanen
- Producers: Off & Out; Chopstix; MdS; Ruuben

Burna Boy singles chronology
"Ginger" (2021)	"Last Last" (2022)	"For My Hand" (2022)

Music video
- "Last Last" on YouTube

"Last Last" is a song by Nigerian singer Burna Boy. It was released through Atlantic Records on 13 May 2022 as the second single from his sixth studio album, Love, Damini. The song samples American singer Toni Braxton's 2000 single "He Wasn't Man Enough", for which its writers LaShawn Daniels, Harvey Mason Jr., and brothers Fred Jerkins III and Darkchild are credited on "Last Last". Burna Boy co-wrote the song with producers Off & Out (brothers Mikael and Samuel Haataja), Chopstix, MdS, and Ruuben. Burna Boy notably performed the song at the 2022 Billboard Music Awards two days after its release.

The official music video for "Last Last", directed by Burna Boy himself, was released alongside the song on 13 May 2022.

== Accolades ==
Year	Award ceremony	Prize	Result	Ref
2022	Soul Train Music Awards	Song of the Year	Nominated	
2022	Soul Train Music Awards	Video of the Year	Nominated	
2022	Soul Train Music Awards	The Ashford & Simpson Songwriter's Award	Nominated	
2023	Grammy Awards	Best Global Music Performance	Nominated	
2023	The Headies	Song of the Year	Won	
2023	The Headies	Afrobeats Single of the Year	Won	
2023	All Africa Music Awards	Song of the Year	Nominated	
2023	BET Awards	Viewer's Choice Award	Nominated	
2023	BMI London Awards	Most Performed Song of the Year	Won	
2023	NAACP Image Awards	Outstanding International Song	Nominated	

== Charts ==
=== Weekly charts ===
Weekly chart performance for "Last Last"
Chart (2022)	Peak position
Australia (ARIA)	79
Belgium (Ultratop 50 Wallonia)	49
Canada Hot 100 (Billboard)	30
France (SNEP)	23
Global 200 (Billboard)	39
Ireland (IRMA)	27
Netherlands (Single Top 100)	14
New Zealand (Recorded Music NZ)	12
Nigeria (TurnTable Top 100)	2
Portugal (AFP)	142
South Africa Airplay (TOSAC)	4
South Africa Streaming (TOSAC)	1
Sweden (Sverigetopplistan)	21
Switzerland (Schweizer Hitparade)	38
UK Singles (Official Charts)	4
UK Hip Hop/R&B (Official Charts)	1
US Billboard Hot 100	44
US Afrobeats Songs (Billboard)	1
US Mainstream R&B/Hip-Hop Airplay (Billboard)	1
US Rhythmic Airplay (Billboard)	2
US World Digital Song Sales (Billboard)	2

Weekly chart performance
Chart (2026)	Peak position
South Africa Airplay (TOSAC)	12

=== Year-end charts ===
2022 year-end chart performance for "Last Last"
Chart (2022)	Position
Belgium (Ultratop 50 Wallonia)	155
Canada (Canadian Hot 100)	77
Global 200 (Billboard)	156
Netherlands (Single Top 100)	45
Nigeria (TurnTable)	7
Switzerland (Schweizer Hitparade)	85
UK Singles (OCC)	26
US Afrobeats Songs (Billboard)	5
US Rhythmic (Billboard)	37

2023 year-end chart performance for "Last Last"
Chart (2023)	Position
Nigeria (TurnTable)	74
UK Singles (OCC)	94
US Afrobeats Songs (Billboard)	5

== Certifications ==
Certifications for "Last Last"
Region	Certification	Certified units/sales
Australia (ARIA)	Platinum	70,000^{‡}
Austria (IFPI Austria)	Gold	15,000^{‡}
Canada (Music Canada)	4× Platinum	320,000^{‡}
Denmark (IFPI Danmark)	Gold	45,000^{‡}
France (SNEP)	Diamond	333,333^{‡}
New Zealand (RMNZ)	3× Platinum	90,000^{‡}
Nigeria (TCSN)	5× Platinum	500,000^{‡}
Switzerland (IFPI Switzerland)	Platinum	20,000^{‡}
United Kingdom (BPI)	2× Platinum	1,200,000^{‡}
United States (RIAA)	Platinum	1,000,000^{‡}
Streaming
Sweden (GLF)	Platinum	8,000,000^{†}
^{‡} Sales+streaming figures based on certification alone.^{†} Streaming-only figures based on certification alone.
