= Forever My Love =

2022 single by J Balvin and Ed Sheeran

Single by J Balvin and Ed Sheeran
- Released: 25 March 2022
- Genre: Pop
- Length: 3:10
- Label: Universal Latin
- Songwriters: José Osorio; Ed Sheeran; Michael Brun; Justin Quiles; Kevyn Moreno
- Producers: Sheeran; Brun

J Balvin singles chronology
"Niño Soñador" (2022)	"Forever My Love" / "Sigue" (2022)	"Voodoo" (2022)

Ed Sheeran singles chronology
"Bam Bam" (2022)	"Forever My Love" / "Sigue" (2022)	"2step" (2022)

Music video
- "Forever My Love" on YouTube

"Forever My Love" is a song by Colombian singer J Balvin and English singer-songwriter Ed Sheeran. It was released as a single through Universal Music Latin Entertainment on 25 March 2022, concurrently with their other collaboration, "Sigue". The song was produced by Sheeran and Michael Brun.

== Background and composition ==
On 21 March 2022, through a social media for promoting the song, Sheeran said that he and Balvin met in a gym in New York in 2021, which led to them having lunch and coffee and tea together that day, and then started chatting with each other. He was performing shows in the area for Christmas at the time and the two artists met up in a recording studio and wrote "Forever My Love" and "Sigue". Sheeran added that "it was a proper challenge learning Spanish for this and I had so much fun doing it". About collaborating with Sheeran, Balvin stated that "I wanted him to come to the world of reggaeton and he invited me to his world as well" and "it was really cool hearing him in Spanish and we hope that you all love the songs as much as we do". Sheeran was also interviewed by New Zealand interviewing channel Project NZ the week before the release of the songs and referred to his next release as "something else that's a bit more of a curveball" and that it would be releasing in ten days, but added that "I don't think it's gonna be a massive hit in New Zealand though" and "it's more gonna be a big hit somewhere else", giving a hint by stating that "when you hear it you'll understand". Writing for Billboard, Jason Lipshutz felt that "J Balvin and Ed Sheeran are both global superstars adept at crafting club-ready pop and heartfelt balladry, and on a new collaborative two-pack, the pair delivers two sides of their artistry while feeding off one another's energy" and "Sheeran sounds confident crooning in Spanish", adding that "Balvin offers bare emotion on the strumming sing-along" song. "Forever My Love" is a pop ballad that is set in the key of C major.

== Music video ==
The official music video for "Forever My Love" premiered on Sheeran's YouTube channel alongside the release of the song and "Sigue" on 25 March 2022. It sees the two artists performing the song together in studio with a black and white background.

== Charts ==
Chart performance for "Forever My Love"
Chart (2022)	Peak position
Colombia (Monitor Latino)	13
Ecuador (Monitor Latino)	6
Guatemala (Monitor Latino)	15
Mexico (Billboard Mexican Airplay)	7
Nicaragua (Monitor Latino)	2
Panama (Monitor Latino)	6
Puerto Rico (Monitor Latino)	1
Switzerland (Schweizer Hitparade)	49
US Bubbling Under Hot 100 (Billboard)	7
US Hot Latin Songs (Billboard)	11
US Latin Airplay (Billboard)	1
US Latin Pop Airplay (Billboard)	1

== See also ==
- List of Billboard Hot Latin Songs and Latin Airplay number ones of 2022
