= American Town =

2023 single by Ed Sheeran

Single by Ed Sheeran

from the album Autumn Variations
- Released: 29 September 2023
- Length: 3:18
- Label: Gingerbread Man
- Songwriters: Ed Sheeran; Aaron Dessner
- Producer: Aaron Dessner

Ed Sheeran singles chronology
"A Beautiful Game" (2023)	"American Town" (2023)	"The Great British Bar Off" (2023)

Lyric video
- "American Town" on YouTube

"American Town" is a song by English singer-songwriter Ed Sheeran, taken from his seventh studio album Autumn Variations, released on 29 September 2023, through Gingerbread Man Records. It was sent to Italian contemporary hit radio on the same day as the album by Warner Records as its lead single. Sheeran wrote the song with producer Aaron Dessner. "American Town" reached top 40 on the charts in the United Kingdom, Sweden and Belgium.

== Composition and lyrics ==
"American Town" has been described as a "de facto sequel" to Sheeran's 2017 single, "Galway Girl". In "American Town", Sheeran sings about falling in love with an "English girl" in an American Town and the two getting "Chinese food in small white boxes, live a life we saw in Friends". The song also contains sung-rapped vocals from Sheeran and lyrics about walking in the cold with dungarees on.

== Charts ==
=== Weekly charts ===
Weekly chart performance for "American Town"
Chart (2023–2024)	Peak position
Australia (ARIA)	86
Belgium (Ultratop 50 Flanders)	15
Croatia (HRT)	26
Czech Republic Airplay (ČNS IFPI)	52
Global 200 (Billboard)	139
Iceland (Tónlistinn)	39
Ireland (IRMA)	46
Japan Hot Overseas (Billboard Japan)	16
Latvia (EHR)	9
Netherlands (Dutch Top 40)	32
Netherlands (Single Top 100)	77
New Zealand Hot Singles (RMNZ)	2
San Marino (SMRRTV Top 50)	22
Slovakia Airplay (ČNS IFPI)	2
South Korea Download (Circle)	141
Sweden (Sverigetopplistan)	24
Switzerland (Schweizer Hitparade)	43
UK Singles (OCC)	27
UK Indie (OCC)	7
US Bubbling Under Hot 100 (Billboard)	10

=== Year-end charts ===
Year-end chart performance for "American Town"
Chart (2024)	Position
Iceland (Tónlistinn)	95
