= I Was Made for Loving You (Tori Kelly song) =

Song by Tori Kelly featuring Ed Sheeran

from the album Unbreakable Smile
- Released: June 23, 2015
- Recorded: 2015
- Genre: Pop; R&B
- Length: 3:06
- Label: Capitol
- Songwriters: Tori Kelly; Ed Sheeran
- Producers: Tori Kelly; Ed Sheeran

Audio video
- "I Was Made for Loving You" on YouTube

"I Was Made for Loving You" is a song by American singer Tori Kelly from her debut studio album, Unbreakable Smile (2015) through Capitol Records. It was written by Kelly and Ed Sheeran.

Commercially, the song reached number 10 on the Billboard Bubbling Under Hot 100 chart.

== Charts ==
Chart (2015)	Peak position
Canada Hot 100 (Billboard)	64
New Zealand (Recorded Music NZ)	21
Scotland Singles (OCC)	50
UK Singles (Official Charts Company)	142
US Bubbling Under Hot 100 (Billboard)	10

== Certifications ==
Region	Certification	Certified units/sales
New Zealand (RMNZ)	2× Platinum	60,000^{‡}
United Kingdom (BPI)	Silver	200,000^{‡}
United States (RIAA)	Gold	500,000^{‡}
^{‡} Sales+streaming figures based on certification alone.
