= Love, Damini =

2022 studio album by Burna Boy

Studio album by Burna Boy
- Released: 8 July 2022
- Recorded: 2021–2022
- Genre: Afro fusion
- Length: 60:34
- Language: English; Nigerian Pidgin; Yoruba; Spanish; Zulu
- Label: Atlantic
- Producer: Amilcar Smith; Anju Blaxx; ATG; Blxst; Chopstix; The Elements; FnZ; Jae5; BKH Beats; Jon Bellion; Kel-P; Kvng Vinci; MdS; The Monsters & Strangerz; Off & Out; P2J; Ruuben; Skread; Telz

Burna Boy chronology
Twice as Tall (2020)	Love, Damini (2022)	I Told Them... (2023)

Singles from Love, Damini
- 1. "Kilometre" Released: 30 April 2021; 2. "Last Last" Released: 13 May 2022; 3. "For My Hand" Released: 11 July 2022; 4. "It's Plenty" Released: 27 September 2022; 5. "Common Person" Released: 30 January 2023; 6. "Rollercoaster" Released: 20 March 2023

Love, Damini is the sixth studio album by Burna Boy. It was released on 8 July 2022 through Atlantic Records. The album features guest appearances from Ladysmith Black Mambazo, J Hus, Vict0ny, Popcaan, Blxst, Kehlani, Ed Sheeran, J Balvin, and Khalid. It was supported by two singles, "Kilometre" and "Last Last". The album is named after Burna Boy's legal first name and serves as the follow-up to his previous album, Twice as Tall (2020).

== Singles ==
One song from the album, "Kilometre", was released as an independent single on 29 April 2021. Another single, "Last Last", was released on 13 May 2022, along with the announcement of the album. The second single "For My Hand" featuring Ed Sheeran, was released on 8 July 2022 and coincided with the release of the album.

== Reception ==
Professional ratings
Aggregate scores
Source	Rating
Metacritic	80/100
Review scores
Source	Rating
AllMusic	4/5 stars
Clash	8/10
The Daily Telegraph	5/5 stars
The Guardian	3/5 stars
NME	3/5 stars
Pitchfork	6.7/10

Love, Damini received generally favorable reviews from music critics. At Metacritic, which assigns a weighted average rating out of 100 to reviews from mainstream publications, this release received an average score of 80 based on 10 reviews. Kathleen Johnston of The Daily Telegraph awarded it a five star rating, saying "Love Damini is by far the most personal record yet from Burna and is best summarized as a love letter to his adoring fans, it is an album for the ages, as well as being an awards season shoo-in." Will Dukes of Rolling Stone said "it is an urgent, heartfelt, and immensely personal snapshot of his struggles, triumphs, and aspirations, with the vibe and chorus signifying a bond between past and present perfectly embodied by this worldly album—that feels instantly rewarding."

Robin Murray in his review for Clash wrote that on Love Damini, Burna is at his best either holding it down for his lineage pushing traditional sounds forward or tracing African influence beyond its shores. Marcus Shorter writing for Consequence said "Love Damini delivers like an 80-pound baby, the Afrobeats album gets into the soul with Burna’s typical flair, but the insights are deeper as he wrestles with his desires, sins, triumphs, and treasures while entering the next phase of his life". Jessica Kariisa in her review for Pitchfork said: "Glaring errors keep Love, Damini from reaching the heights of Burna Boy's prior work, but his intentions are admirable even when the execution goes awry. [...] Whatever its failings, Love, Damini paves the way for other artists in the scene to take bigger emotional risks".

== Track listing ==
Love, Damini track listing
No.	Title	Writer(s)	Producer(s)	Length
1.	"Glory" (featuring Ladysmith Black Mambazo)	Damini Ogulu; James Johnson; Keven Wolfsohn; Mike Stokes; Paul Goller	The Elements	3:51
2.	"Science"	Ogulu; Richard Isong	P2J	3:21
3.	"Cloak & Dagger" (featuring J Hus)	Ogulu; Momodou Jallow; Alli Odunayo	Telz; Danitello; MdS	3:31
4.	"Kilometre"	Ogulu; James Olagundoye	Chopstix	2:32
5.	"Jagele"	Ogulu; Kelvin Peters	Kel-P	3:02
6.	"Dirty Secrets"	Ogulu; Judd; Isong	P2J	2:31
7.	"Whiskey"	Ogulu; Gaetan Judd; Marco Bernardis; Isong	P2J	3:23
8.	"Last Last"	Ogulu; LaShawn Daniels; Harvey Mason Jr.; Fred Jerkins III; Rodney Jerkins; Mikael Haataja; Samuel Haataja; Olagundoye; Santeri Kauppinen; Robert Laukkanen	Off & Out; Chopstix; MdS; Ruuben	2:52
9.	"Different Size" (featuring Vict0ny)	Ogulu; Anthony Victor; Adedotun Adedeji; Jae Il Jung	Kvng Vinci	3:29
10.	"It's Plenty"	Ogulu; Wolfsohn; Goller; Jonathan Awotwe-Mensah	The Elements; Jae5	3:36
11.	"Toni-Ann Singh" (featuring Popcaan)	Ogulu; Andrae Sutherland; Andrew Myrie; Amilcar Smith	Anju Blaxx; Smith	2:55
12.	"Solid" (featuring Blxst and Kehlani)	Ogulu; Matthew Burdette; Kehlani Parrish; Ashton Sellars	Blxst; BKH Beats; Sellars^{[c]}	3:15
13.	"For My Hand" (featuring Ed Sheeran)	Ogulu; Ed Sheeran; Isong	P2J	2:39
14.	"Rollercoaster" (featuring J Balvin)	Ogulu; José Osorio Balvin; Matthieu Le Carpentier	Skread	3:07
15.	"Vanilla"	Ogulu; Alexander Ogunmokun	ATG	2:35
16.	"Common Person"	Ogulu; Odunayo	Telz	3:30
17.	"Wild Dreams" (featuring Khalid)	Ogulu; Khalid Robinson; Odunayo; Jonathan Bellion; Jordan K. Johnson; Stefan Johnson; Michael Pollack	The Monsters & Strangerz; Jon Bellion; Telz^{[a]}	3:06
18.	"How Bad Could It Be"	Ogulu; Odunayo; Michael Mule; Isaac DeBoni; Rory Noble	FnZ; Noble^{[a]}	4:57
19.	"Love, Damini" (featuring Ladysmith Black Mambazo)	Ogulu; Jeff Kleinman; Michael Uzowuru	Kleinman; Uzowuru	2:22
Total length:				60:34

Notes

- ^{^[a]} indicates an additional producer
- ^{^[c]} indicates a co-producer
- "Last Last" contains a sample of "He Wasn't Man Enough", performed by Toni Braxton.
- "Different Size" contains audio sampled from the Korean version of "Squid Game".
- Initial CD pressings do not contain J Hus's verse on "Cloak & Dagger", feature "Dirty Secrets" as track 10, and do not include "Toni-Ann Singh".

== Personnel ==
Musicians

- Burna Boy – vocals
- Ladysmith Black Mambazo – additional vocals (tracks 1, 19)
- Oise Benson – additional vocals (1)
- Gaetan Judd – guitar (2)
- Marco Bernardis – saxophone (2)
- Akerele Samson – background vocals (7)
- Asake – background vocals (7)
- Kwande Bawa – background vocals (7, 9)
- Olusola Ogundipo – background vocals (7)
- Jonathan Awotwe-Mensah – background vocals (9)
- Keven Wolfsohn – background vocals (9)
- Paul Bogumil – background vocals (9)
- Uncle T – background vocals (9)
- Tony Mars – saxophone (15)
- Nissi Ogulu – additional vocals (16)
- Shuga Saund – guitar (16)
- Jon Bellion – backing vocals, instruments, programming (17)
- Jordan K. Johnson – backing vocals, instruments, programming (17)
- Stefan Johnson – backing vocals, instruments, programming (17)
- Michael Pollack – backing vocals (17)
- David Campbell – conductor, orchestral arrangement (17)
- Steve Churchyard – orchestration (17)
- Jacob Braun – cello (17)
- Paula Hochhalter – cello (17)
- Ross Gasworth – cello (17)
- Dylan Hart – French horn (17)
- Pierre-Luc Rioux – guitar (17)
- Thomas Hooten – trumpet (17)
- Andrew Duckles – viola (17)
- David Walther – viola (17)
- Charlie Bisharat – violin (17)
- Joel Pargman – violin (17)
- Josefina Vergara – violin (17)
- Kerenza Peacock – violin (17)
- Mario De Leon – violin (17)
- Michele Richards – violin (17)
- Neil Samples – violin (17)
- Sara Parkins – violin (17)
- Sarah Thornblade – violin (17)
- Jorja Smith – additional vocals (18)
- Kamaru Usman – additional vocals (18)
- Naomi Campbell – additional vocals (18)
- Swizz Beatz – additional vocals (18)
- Dunni Alexandra Lawal – background vocals (18)

Technical

- Gerhard Westphalen – mastering
- Jesse Ray Ernster – mixing (all tracks), recording (3)
- The Elements – recording (1)
- P2J – recording (2, 10, 13)
- Eric Isaac Utere – recording (3, 4, 6, 9, 11, 14)
- Chopstix – recording (4, 7)
- Kel-P – recording (5)
- Otis Milestone – recording (12, 18, 19)
- ATG - recording (15)
- Telz – recording (16)
- Joe Begalla – mixing assistance
- Noah "MixGiant" Glassman – mixing assistance

== Charts ==
=== Weekly charts ===
Weekly chart performance for Love, Damini
Chart (2022)	Peak position
Australian Hitseekers Albums (ARIA)	2
Belgian Albums (Ultratop Flanders)	24
Belgian Albums (Ultratop Wallonia)	29
Canadian Albums (Billboard)	6
Danish Albums (Hitlisten)	8
Dutch Albums (Album Top 100)	2
French Albums (SNEP)	17
German Albums (Offizielle Top 100)	61
Irish Albums (OCC)	23
Nigerian Albums (TurnTable)	3
Norwegian Albums (VG-lista)	6
Swedish Albums (Sverigetopplistan)	12
Swiss Albums (Schweizer Hitparade)	6
UK Albums (OCC)	2
UK R&B Albums (OCC)	1
US Billboard 200	14
US World Albums (Billboard)	2

=== Year-end charts ===
2022 year-end chart performance for Love, Damini
Chart (2022)	Position
Danish Albums (Hitlisten)	84
Dutch Albums (Album Top 100)	11
French Albums (SNEP)	164

2023 year-end chart performance for Love, Damini
Chart (2023)	Position
Dutch Albums (Album Top 100)	18
French Albums (SNEP)	167

== Certifications ==
Certifications for Love, Damini
Region	Certification	Certified units/sales
Canada (Music Canada)	Platinum	80,000^{‡}
Denmark (IFPI Danmark)	Platinum	20,000^{‡}
France (SNEP)	Gold	50,000^{‡}
Netherlands (NVPI)	Gold	20,000^{‡}
New Zealand (RMNZ)	Platinum	15,000^{‡}
Nigeria (TCSN)	5× Platinum	250,000^{‡}
Sweden (GLF)	Gold	15,000^{‡}
United Kingdom (BPI)	Gold	100,000^{‡}
^{‡} Sales+streaming figures based on certification alone.

== See also ==
- List of UK R&B Albums Chart number ones of 2022
