= Bibia Be Ye Ye =

Song by Ed Sheeran

from the album ÷
- Released: 3 March 2017
- Recorded: 2016
- Genre: Worldbeat, pop rock
- Length: 2:56
- Label: Asylum; Atlantic
- Songwriters: Benny Blanco; Ed Sheeran; Fuse ODG; KillBeatz; Stephen Woode; Shaam Panch
- Producers: Benny Blanco; Ed Sheeran; KillBeatz

Music Video
- "Bibia Be Ye Ye" on YouTube

"Bibia Be Ye Ye" is a song by English singer-songwriter Ed Sheeran. It was included on the deluxe edition of his third studio album ÷ (2017) and is the fourteenth track. It was written by Benny Blanco, Ed Sheeran, Fuse ODG, KillBeatz, Shaam Panch, and Stephen Woode with Sheeran, Blanco and KillBeatz handling the production. After the album's release it charted at number 18 on the UK Singles Chart, despite not being an official single.

== Critical reception ==
Celeb Mix writer Ellie Doe-Demosse stated: "Bibia Be Ye Ye is 100% one of the greatest songs on this album. For those of you who are intrigued by the title and its meaning, Bibia Be Ye Ye means "all will be well" in one of Ghana's many native languages, Twi. Yes, Ed wrote this song while he was staying in Ghana on his hiatus and again, we love how he incorporated African/Ghanaian culture in his album. It displays diversity among different cultures, and that's a special and unique thing to see, which is something we love a lot."

== Music video ==
A music video for this song was uploaded to YouTube on 3 August 2017. It features Sheeran having a trip to Ghana, intercut with the residents singing the song.

== Charts and certifications ==
=== Weekly charts ===
Chart (2017)	Peak position
Australia (ARIA)	39
Austria (Ö3 Austria Top 40)	59
Canada Hot 100 (Billboard)	57
France (SNEP)	130
Germany (GfK)	52
Ireland (IRMA)	14
Netherlands (Single Top 100)	24
New Zealand (Recorded Music NZ)	29
Scotland Singles (OCC)	36
Spain (PROMUSICAE)	77
Sweden (Sverigetopplistan)	56
UK Singles (OCC)	18
US Bubbling Under Hot 100 (Billboard)	5

=== Certifications ===
Region	Certification	Certified units/sales
Canada (Music Canada)	Platinum	80,000^{‡}
Denmark (IFPI Danmark)	Gold	45,000^{‡}
New Zealand (RMNZ)	Platinum	30,000^{‡}
United Kingdom (BPI)	Platinum	600,000^{‡}
United States (RIAA)	Gold	500,000^{‡}
^{‡} Sales+streaming figures based on certification alone.
