= 2step (song) =

Single by Ed Sheeran

from the album =
- Released: 22 April 2022
- Genre: Pop rap
- Length: 2:43 (single version); 2:33 (album version)
- Label: Asylum; Atlantic
- Songwriters: Ed Sheeran; David Hodges; Louis Bell; Andrew Wotman
- Producers: Bell; Watt

Ed Sheeran singles chronology
"Sigue" / "Forever My Love" (2022)	"2step" (2022)	"For My Hand" (2022)

Lil Baby singles chronology
"In a Minute" (2022)	"2step" (2022)	"Frozen" (2022)

Music video
- "2step" on YouTube

"2step" is a song by English singer-songwriter Ed Sheeran from his fifth studio album = (2021), appearing as the ninth track on its track listing. It was written by Sheeran, David Hodges, Louis Bell and Andrew Wotman, and produced by the latter two. A remix featuring American rapper Lil Baby was released on 22 April 2022, making it the fifth and final single from the album. It was sent to hot adult contemporary radio in the United States three days later. On 2 May 2022, Sheeran released a version of the song featuring Ukrainian pop-rock band Antytila, and later released an additional 12 "global remixes" of the song, with artists from Finland, India, Italy, Sweden, Spain, Australia, France, the United Kingdom, Ireland, and Brazil.

== Background ==
Sheeran said that he wrote this song from the "lowest point of confidence" telling Dev: "Every song I did, I would send in and just get a lukewarm reaction. I went into the studio and just wrote about being really low on confidence and I think that's probably one of my favorite songs on the album."

== Promotion and release ==
On 19 August 2021, Sheeran announced his fifth studio album, = in which the song is listed number ninth on the tracklist. On 29 October 2021, "2step" was released alongside other album tracks that appeared on the album =.

== Lyric video ==
A lyric video for the song was uploaded on Sheeran's YouTube account on 29 October 2021 along with the other lyric videos of the songs that appeared on the tracklisting of =.

== Music video ==
The music video for the single version of the song, filmed in Kyiv, Ukraine and directed by Henry Scholfield, was uploaded to YouTube on 22 April 2022. The video was filmed prior to the 2022 Russian invasion of Ukraine, and all revenue from YouTube streams are earmarked for Ukraine.

== Track listing ==
- Digital download, streaming and CD – Single
1. "2step" (featuring Lil Baby) – 2:43
- Digital download and streaming – The Remixes
1. "2step" (featuring Lil Baby) – 2:43
2. "2step" (featuring Ultimo) – 2:34
3. "2step" (featuring Potter Payper) – 2:33
4. "2step" (featuring Antytila) – 2:33
5. "2step" (featuring Leto) – 2:34
6. "2step" (featuring Ellinoora) – 2:33
7. "2step" (featuring 1.Cuz) – 2:33
8. "2step" (featuring Budjerah) – 2:33
9. "2step" (Star.One remix) – 3:25
10. "2step" (featuring Chefin) – 2:44
11. "2step" (featuring reezy) – 2:33
12. "2step" (featuring Quevedo) – 2:33
13. "2step" (featuring Denise Chaila) – 2:33
- Digital download and streaming – Single
1. "2step" (featuring Armaan Malik) – 2:33

== Credits and personnel ==
- Ed Sheeran – vocals, guitar, production, songwriting, writing
- David Hodges – production, songwriting, writing
- Louis Bell – drums, keyboards, production, programming
- Andrew Watt – guitar, keyboards, production, programming
- Stuart Hawkes – mastering
- Mark "Spike" Stent – mixing
- Paul LaMalfa – engineering

== Charts ==
=== Weekly charts ===
Weekly chart performance for "2step" (solo or with featured artist)
Chart (2021–2023)	Peak position
Australia (ARIA)	40
Austria (Ö3 Austria Top 40)	39
Belgium (Ultratop 50 Flanders)	22
Belgium (Ultratop 50 Wallonia)	13
Canada Hot 100 (Billboard)	21
Canada AC (Billboard)	22
Canada CHR/Top 40 (Billboard)	4
Canada Hot AC (Billboard)	11
Czech Republic Airplay (ČNS IFPI)	1
Czech Republic Singles Digital (ČNS IFPI)	57
Denmark (Tracklisten)	11
Finland (Suomen virallinen lista)	2
France (SNEP)	35
Germany (GfK)	41
Global 200 (Billboard)	33
Hungary (Single Top 40)	15
Iceland (Tónlistinn)	37
Ireland (IRMA)	9
Italy (FIMI)	24
Japan Hot Overseas (Billboard Japan)	4
Netherlands (Single Top 100)	79
New Zealand Hot Singles (RMNZ)	4
Norway (VG-lista)	22
Portugal (AFP)	154
Romania Airplay (Media Forest)	8
San Marino (SMRRTV Top 50) Version with Ultimo	17
Slovakia Airplay (ČNS IFPI)	31
Slovakia Singles Digital (ČNS IFPI)	61
South Korea (Gaon)	151
Sweden (Sverigetopplistan)	1
Switzerland (Schweizer Hitparade)	30
UK Singles (Official Charts)	9
Ukraine Airplay (TopHit)	1
US Billboard Hot 100	48
US Adult Contemporary (Billboard)	28
US Adult Pop Airplay (Billboard)	11
US Dance Airplay (Billboard)	36
US Pop Airplay (Billboard)	14
US Rhythmic Airplay (Billboard)	14

=== Monthly charts ===
Monthly chart performance for "2step"
Chart (2022)	Peak position
Ukraine Airplay (TopHit)	4

=== Year-end charts ===
2022 year-end chart performance for "2step"
Chart (2022)	Position
Belgium (Ultratop Flanders)	156
Belgium (Ultratop Wallonia)	52
Canada (Canadian Hot 100)	37
France (SNEP)	117
Global 200 (Billboard)	151
Sweden (Sverigetopplistan)	40
UK Singles (OCC)	49
Ukraine Airplay (TopHit)	8
US Adult Top 40 (Billboard)	28
US Mainstream Top 40 (Billboard)	47

2023 year-end chart performance for "2step"
Chart (2022)	Position
Ukraine Airplay (TopHit)	107

== Certifications ==
Certifications and sales for "2step"
Region	Certification	Certified units/sales
Austria (IFPI Austria)	Gold	15,000^{‡}
Canada (Music Canada)	2× Platinum	160,000^{‡}
Denmark (IFPI Danmark)	Gold	45,000^{‡}
France (SNEP)	Platinum	200,000^{‡}
Italy (FIMI)	Platinum	100,000^{‡}
New Zealand (RMNZ)	Platinum	30,000^{‡}
Poland (ZPAV)	Gold	25,000^{‡}
United Kingdom (BPI)	Platinum	600,000^{‡}
Streaming
Sweden (GLF)	Platinum	8,000,000^{†}
^{‡} Sales+streaming figures based on certification alone.^{†} Streaming-only figures based on certification alone.

== Release history ==
Release dates and formats for "2step"
Region	Date	Format(s)	Version	Label	Ref.
Various	22 April 2022	Digital download; streaming	featuring Lil Baby	Asylum; Atlantic	
United States	25 April 2022	Hot adult contemporary	album version	Atlantic	
United States	26 April 2022	Contemporary hit radio	featuring Lil Baby	Atlantic	
Various	2 May 2022	Digital download; streaming	featuring Antytila	Asylum; Atlantic	
Various	4 May 2022	Digital download; streaming	featuring Ellinoora	Asylum; Atlantic	
Various	6 May 2022	Digital download; streaming	featuring Ultimo	Asylum; Atlantic	
Various	9 May 2022	Digital download; streaming	featuring 1.Cuz	Asylum; Atlantic	
Various	11 May 2022	Digital download; streaming	featuring Budjerah	Asylum; Atlantic	
Various	12 May 2022	Digital download; streaming	Star.One remix	Asylum; Atlantic	
Various	13 May 2022	Digital download; streaming	featuring Leto	Asylum; Atlantic	
Various	16 May 2022	Digital download; streaming	featuring Chefin	Asylum; Atlantic	
Various	18 May 2022	Digital download; streaming	featuring reezy	Asylum; Atlantic	
Various	20 May 2022	Digital download; streaming	featuring Potter Payper	Asylum; Atlantic	
Various	23 May 2022	Digital download; streaming	featuring Quevedo	Asylum; Atlantic	
Various	25 May 2022	Digital download; streaming	featuring Denise Chaila	Asylum; Atlantic	
Various	3 June 2022	Digital download; streaming	featuring Armaan Malik	Asylum; Atlantic	
