= Jethro Sheeran =

Music artist and producer

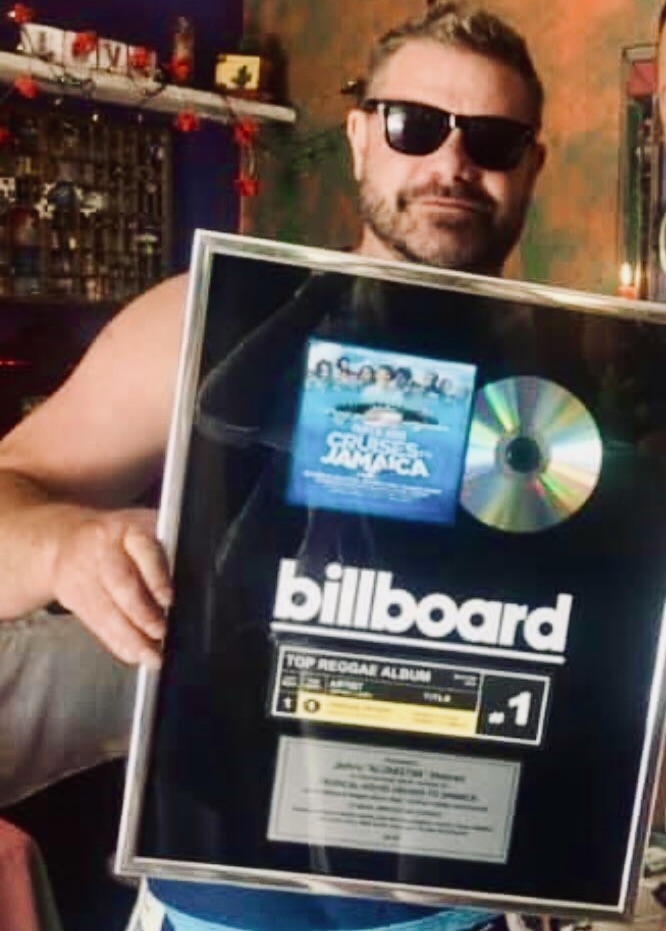

Background information
- Also known as: Alonestar
- Born: Jethro Callow Sheeran
- Origin: Bristol, England
- Occupations: Musician; music producer; rapper; fashion model
- Years active: 2004–2017
- Labels: Sony Music; AWAL; EMI Music Publishing; Eternal Life; Urban Angel

Jethro Callow Sheeran, known professionally as Alonestar, is a British musician, record producer, rapper, and fashion model from Bristol, England. His work includes elements of hip-hop, urban, reggae, and electronic music.

== Early life and education ==
Alonestar was born and grew up in Bristol, where he attended Cotham Grammar School. He is the cousin of English singer-songwriter Ed Sheeran.

In 2000 he started a hip hop duo called LOCKDOWN with Lee Stafford, and toured the UK.

== Career ==
In 2011, Alonestar signed with EMI and released the Warrior EP, which featured collaborations with Jaja Soze, Rosie Ribbons, and his first cousin, Ed Sheeran, on the track "All Falls Down." Alongside this project he participated on the album Dubstep and Funky, Other collaborations included "Real Life," "All Falls Down," and "Raise Em Up".

On July 19, 2024, Azerbaijani-Russian pop star and entrepreneur EMIN collaborated with Sheeran to release two dance remixes of the song "Beautiful Tonight".

His 2017 project, Tropical House – Cruises to Jamaica, which featured Damian Marley, Sean Paul, Sean Kingston, Lee "Scratch" Perry, and Stephen Marley, reached No. 1 on the US Billboard Reggae chart, maintaining that position for five consecutive weeks and remaining within the top five for an additional 15 weeks.

The album Sunshine and Rain (2023), produced by African producer Herbert Skillz, featured the lead single "Raise Em Up" (with Ed Sheeran).

== Awards ==
Alonestar won the Exposure Music Awards for Best Urban Song and Best Male Artist in 2019.

== Discography ==
=== Albums and EPs ===
- 2010 Isophase Light
- 2012 Warrior EP
- 2012 Arms to the Sun EP
- 2014 Live Hard, Love Strong EP
- 2015 Cornerstone
- 2017 Tropical House – Cruises to Jamaica compilation (reached no 1 on the Billboard Reggae charts in February 2018)

=== Singles ===
- 2010 "Raise Em Up" featuring Ed Sheeran
- 2012 "Flyaway"
- 2012 "Real Life" featuring Ed Sheeran
- 2013 "Going Home" featuring Rosie Ribbons
- 2013 "'All Falls Down" featuring Ed Sheeran and Rosie Ribbons
- 2013 "Full Flame" featuring Metro Man
- 2017 "Lovelorn" featuring Rosie Ribbons and Angelo Bruschini
- 2017 "Outlaw" featuring Tim Starr and Contractor on the Tropical House – Cruises to Jamaica album
