= Autumn Variations =

Studio album by Ed Sheeran
- Released: 29 September 2023
- Studio: Gingerbread (London); Narwhal (Chicago); The Dwelling (New York); Treehouse (Suffolk); Sonic Ranch (El Paso); Smilo (Orcas Island); The Schoolhouse (Gansevoort)
- Genre: Folk
- Length: 49:05
- Label: Gingerbread Man
- Producer: Aaron Dessner

Ed Sheeran chronology
− (2023)	Autumn Variations (2023)	+−=÷× (Tour Collection) (2024)

Singles from Autumn Variations
- 1. "American Town" Released: 29 September 2023

Autumn Variations is the seventh studio album by English singer-songwriter Ed Sheeran. It was released on 29 September 2023 through his record label, Gingerbread Man Records. All tracks on the album were solely produced by Aaron Dessner, except the track "Spring", which was produced by Dessner together with his twin brother Bryce. The album also serves as Sheeran's second project of 2023, following the May release of his previous album −, and is the first studio album for which he owns the copyright. Autumn Variations received mixed reviews from music critics and topped the charts the United Kingdom, Australia, Germany, Austria, and the Netherlands.

== Background ==
On 24 August 2023, Sheeran announced the album on social media, in which he said: "Last autumn, I found that my friends and I were going through so many life changes. After the heat of the summer, everything either calmed, settled, fell apart, came to a head or imploded". He also added: "My dad and brother told me about a composer called Elgar, who composed Enigma Variations, where each of the 14 compositions were about a different one of his friends. This is what inspired me to make this album".

The album is his first studio album released independently on his own label, Gingerbread Man Records. Sheeran said that there would be no singles or music videos released to promote the album, although one single, "American Town", was sent to Italian contemporary hit radio the same day as the album was released.

On 2 October 2023, the Fan Living Room Sessions edition of Autumn Variations was released. Each song was recorded live in a different fan's living room.

On 21 September 2023, Sheeran performed "American Town", "Magical", "Blue" and "Plastic Bag" during his Amazon Music Live concert; the performance of "Plastic Bag" was uploaded on YouTube on 26 September 2023. Several songs from Autumn Variations were also performed during the - Tour between July and September 2023, and during the +–=÷× Tour concert in Inglewood on 23 September 2023.

Five live acoustic videos of "American Town", "Plastic Bag", "Magical", "Blue", and "When Will I Be Alright" were uploaded on YouTube shortly after the album was released.

On 18 and 19 November 2023, Sheeran performed Autumn Variations in its entirety at the Royal Albert Hall, London.

== Critical reception ==
Professional ratings
Aggregate scores
Source	Rating
AnyDecentMusic?	5.2/10
Metacritic	62/100
Review scores
Source	Rating
The Arts Desk	2/5 stars
The Guardian	2/5 stars
The Independent	3/5 stars
The Irish Times	2/5 stars
NME	2/5 stars
The Telegraph	5/5 stars

Autumn Variations received a score of 62 out of 100 on review aggregator Metacritic based on 6 critics' reviews, indicating "generally favorable" reception.

James Hall of The Telegraph gave the album five out of five stars and called it "meatier, more absorbing and more varied than the slightly monotonic Subtract", opining that "Sheeran sounds like a supercharged David Gray. Grown-up. Energised. Forget Autumn, this feels like an album of bright new dawns". Helen Brown of The Independent found that Sheeran "sticks to the busker'n'beats style that's made him the best-selling male artist of the past decade" and on the album he is "in mellow, misty-eyed mode, rather than the cringier dancefloor zone of Collaborations".

By contrast, NME's Thomas Smith wrote that "the nuance and specificity of his last album's songwriting is largely absent; instead Autumn Variations is akin to aimlessly swiping through Instagram, blurry snaps of followers' leafy happenings whizzing past in a distracted daze". Rachel Aroesti of The Guardian described the album as a "another occasion to despair at the colossal popularity of such proudly unimaginative, staunchly unoriginal and intellectually bereft music", with "dashed-off lyrics, half-arsed even by Sheeran's standards" and that "many don't rhyme, scan or even make basic sense".

== Commercial performance ==
In the UK, Autumn Variations debuted as Sheeran's seventh number one on the UK Albums Chart selling 30,016 units (16,027 CD, 6,121 vinyl albums, 2,188 digital downloads and 5,680 sales-equivalent streams). The album charted in the top 10 for two weeks, leaving the top 40 in its third week.

In the United States, Autumn Variations debuted at number four on the Billboard 200 with 62,000 album-equivalent units, which included 46,500 pure album sales, marking the highest debut of the week and the best-selling album of the week in terms of pure sales. Autumn Variations marks Sheeran's seventh top-ten album on the Billboard 200 and second in 2023. Of Autumn Variations's 46,500 first-week sales, physical sales comprised 33,500 (17,500 on CD and 16,000 on vinyl, his largest week ever on vinyl) and digital downloads comprised a little over 13,000. The album marked Sheeran's fourth number-one album on the Billboard Vinyl Albums chart. In the second week, the album fell at number 96 on the Billboard 200, following which it exited the chart.

== Track listing ==
All tracks are written by Ed Sheeran and Aaron Dessner, except for "Blue", written by Sheeran and Foy Vance, and "Spring", written by Ed Sheeran, Aaron Dessner, and Bryce Dessner.

Standard edition
No.	Title	Length
1.	"Magical"	3:14
2.	"England"	3:46
3.	"Amazing"	4:05
4.	"Plastic Bag"	3:49
5.	"Blue"	2:33
6.	"American Town"	3:17
7.	"That's on Me"	3:47
8.	"Page"	3:51
9.	"Midnight"	2:59
10.	"Spring"	2:58
11.	"Punchline"	3:26
12.	"When Will I Be Alright"	2:55
13.	"The Day I Was Born"	4:12
14.	"Head > Heels"	4:13
Total length:		49:05

Notes

- The Fan Living Room Sessions edition includes live versions of all 14 tracks.

== Personnel ==
Credits adapted from the album's liner notes.

- Ed Sheeran – vocals (all tracks), acoustic guitar (track 12)
- Aaron Dessner – production (all tracks), guitars (1–4, 6–11, 13, 14), drum programming (1–4, 6–9, 11, 14), OP-1 (1–4, 6, 10, 14), Mellotron (1, 2, 4, 6–8, 11, 14), MS-20 (1, 6, 14), sub-bass (1), Juno (1, 4, 7, 8, 14), percussion (2, 3, 6–11, 13), piano (2, 3, 6, 10, 13, 14), bass synthesiser (2, 3, 14), Wurlitzer (2, 6, 9), Yamaha synthesiser (3, 9), recording (3), acoustic guitar (5, 12), drum kit (6, 13); rubber bridge, Fender VI (7); Prophet-X (9)
- Jonathan Low – mixing (all tracks), engineering (1–4, 7–14), recording (1–4, 6–14)
- Bella Blasko – engineering, recording
- Randy Merrill – mastering
- Mike Hillier – vinyl cut
- James McAlister – recording (1, 4, 6–8, 11, 13), cheat codes (1, 4, 11), Pulsar (1, 6); ghostly clouds, Omnichord, OP-Z, Prophet, guitars (1); Vermona (2, 4); percussion, 808 (2); Moog (3, 4, 6–8, 13), Ace Tone (3, 4, 6, 7, 11, 13), Prophet '08 (3, 4, 6, 7, 13), Juno pulse (3, 4, 6), drum kit (3, 4, 9), maracas (3, 4), Buchla (3, 7); bloops, Boss DR55 drum machine, drum arrangement, electric guitar, piano riff, floor tom, sampled fill (3); shaker (4, 6, 8); brushes, CS-80, JM (4, 8); bell, blooper swells, backbeat, Cherry CR, giant bridge pad pulse (4); Sponge Piano (6, 7, 11), Lyra-8 (6, 7, 13), tambourine (6–8); guitar bloops, sub 808, table beat (6); 808 bass, drum loop, Roland R-8 (7); Chimeatron, woodblock (8); synthesiser, Minimoog (9); kick sample, lo-fi snare, vocal chops (11); GoldStar (13)
- Benjamin Lanz – trombone arrangement (1, 2, 4, 6, 11), trombone (1, 2, 4, 6, 11, 13), recording (2, 13), modular synthesiser (2)
- JT Bates – drum kit (1, 2, 6, 13), kick drum (7)
- Josh Kaufman – guitars (1, 3, 4), Yamaha synthesiser (4)
- Reggie Pace – trombone (1, 6, 11)
- James Krivchenia – tambourine, shaker (1)
- Bryce Dessner – orchestration (2, 10), glitchy loops (2), production (10)
- Clarice Jensen – cello, recording (2, 10)
- Yuki Numata – violin (2, 10)
- Kyle Resnick – recording (2, 10)
- Ryan Olson – Allovers (2)
- Thomas Bartlett – Mellotron, Prophet-X, recording (3, 4, 7, 11, 13); OP-1, piano (3, 4, 7, 11); Wurlitzer (3, 4, 11, 13)
- Bryan Devendorf – drum kit (3, 8, 11)
- Glenn Kotche – drum kit (4, 7, 14), shaker (6, 14); snare brushes, bongos (6); fills, percussion (7); toms (8, 14), tambourine (14)
- Chad Copelin – recording (4)
- Rob Moose – orchestration, violin, viola (5, 7, 8, 11–14); recording (5, 11, 12, 14)
- Walter Martin – organ, recording (9)
- Misty Boyce – piano (12)
- Bridget Kearney – upright bass (12)
- Scarlett Curtis – artwork
- Alex Cowper – design

== Charts ==
Chart performance for Autumn Variations
Chart (2023)	Peak position
Australian Albums (ARIA)	1
Austrian Albums (Ö3 Austria)	1
Belgian Albums (Ultratop Flanders)	2
Belgian Albums (Ultratop Wallonia)	2
Canadian Albums (Billboard)	4
Croatian International Albums (HDU)	4
Czech Albums (ČNS IFPI)	23
Danish Albums (Hitlisten)	2
Dutch Albums (Album Top 100)	1
Finnish Albums (Suomen virallinen lista)	9
French Albums (SNEP)	5
German Albums (Offizielle Top 100)	1
Greek Albums (IFPI)	57
Hungarian Albums (MAHASZ)	18
Icelandic Albums (Tónlistinn)	22
Irish Albums (OCC)	2
Italian Albums (FIMI)	15
Japanese Albums (Oricon)	28
Japanese Combined Albums (Oricon)	36
Japanese Hot Albums (Billboard Japan)	26
Lithuanian Albums (AGATA)	79
New Zealand Albums (RMNZ)	2
Norwegian Albums (VG-lista)	3
Polish Albums (ZPAV)	7
Portuguese Albums (AFP)	8
Scottish Albums (OCC)	2
Slovak Albums (ČNS IFPI)	4
Spanish Albums (Promusicae)	15
Swedish Albums (Sverigetopplistan)	3
Swiss Albums (Schweizer Hitparade)	2
UK Albums (OCC)	1
UK Independent Albums (OCC)	1
US Billboard 200	4
US Americana/Folk Albums (Billboard)	1

== Certifications ==
Certifications for Autumn Variations
Region	Certification	Certified units/sales
United Kingdom (BPI)	Silver	71,781

== Release history ==
Release history and formats for Autumn Variations
Region	Date	Format(s)	Edition(s)	Label	Ref.
Various	29 September 2023	CD; vinyl; digital download; streaming	Standard	Gingerbread Man	
Various	2 October 2023	Digital download; streaming	Fan living room sessions	Gingerbread Man	
