= For My Hand =

2022 single by Burna Boy featuring Ed Sheeran

Single by Burna Boy featuring Ed Sheeran

from the album Love, Damini
- Released: 11 July 2022
- Length: 2:39
- Label: Atlantic
- Songwriters: Damini Ogulu; Ed Sheeran; Richard Isong
- Producer: P2J

Burna Boy singles chronology
"Last Last" (2022)	"For My Hand" (2022)	"Sittin' on Top of the World" (2023)

Ed Sheeran singles chronology
"2step" (2022)	"For My Hand" (2022)	"Are You Entertained" (2022)

Music video
- "For My Hand" on YouTube

"For My Hand" is a song by Nigerian singer Burna Boy, featuring vocals from English singer-songwriter Ed Sheeran. It was released through Atlantic Records on 8 July 2022 as the third single from Burna Boy's sixth studio album, Love, Damini, along with the album. Burna Boy and Ed Sheeran wrote the song with producer P2J. It marks the second collaboration between the two artists, as they were both featured on British rapper Stormzy's single, "Own It", from his second studio album, Heavy Is the Head (2019). On 30 June 2022, Sheeran brought Burna Boy out during his performance at Wembley Stadium in his home country of the United Kingdom, in which the two artists performed "For My Hand" for the first time.

== Composition and lyrics ==
On "For My Hand", Burna Boy brings Ed Sheeran into his world of music. The love song is focused on emotions and honesty in relationships, as they sing about wanting to be accepted for who they are: "Take me as I am". It has been described as a "wedding-song-worthy vow of mutual devotion through rough times", in which they sing: "Whenever I'm broken, you make me feel whole".

== Music video ==
The official music video for "For My Hand" premiered alongside the release of the song and album on 8 July 2022. Burna Boy and Ed Sheeran sing inside an elevator. The two artists stand at the top of New York City and Burna Boy becomes one with the clouds in the sky. The video ends with a couple dancing in the same elevator, who stay touching each other. They rise up to the sea and the sky as they go to the top of a skyscraper.

== Credits and personnel ==
- Burna Boy – lead vocals, songwriting
- Ed Sheeran – featured vocals, songwriting
- P2J – production, songwriting, recording
- Jesse Ray Ernster – mixing
- Gerhard Westphalen – mastering
- Joe Begalla – mixing assistance
- Noah "MixGiant" Glassman – mixing assistance

== Charts ==
=== Weekly charts ===
Weekly chart performance for "For My Hand"
Chart (2022)	Peak position
Canada Hot 100 (Billboard)	63
Denmark (Tracklisten)	23
France (SNEP)	173
Global 200 (Billboard)	52
Ireland (IRMA)	47
Mexico (Billboard Ingles Airplay)	23
Netherlands (Dutch Top 40)	28
Netherlands (Single Top 100)	25
New Zealand Hot Singles (RMNZ)	15
Romania Airplay (Media Forest)	8
South Africa Streaming (TOSAC)	4
Suriname (Nationale Top 40)	3
Sweden (Sverigetopplistan)	38
Switzerland (Schweizer Hitparade)	59
UK Singles (OCC)	18
UK Afrobeats Singles (OCC)	1
UK Hip Hop/R&B (OCC)	6
US Bubbling Under Hot 100 (Billboard)	13
US Afrobeats Songs (Billboard)	2
World Digital Song Sales (Billboard)	3

=== Year-end charts ===
Year-end chart performance for "For My Hand"
Chart (2022)	Position
Denmark (Tracklisten)	92
Netherlands (Single Top 100)	67
US Afrobeats Songs (Billboard)	9

== Certifications ==
Certifications for "For My Hand"
Region	Certification	Certified units/sales
Australia (ARIA)	Gold	35,000^{‡}
Canada (Music Canada)	2× Platinum	160,000^{‡}
Denmark (IFPI Danmark)	Platinum	90,000^{‡}
France (SNEP)	Gold	100,000^{‡}
New Zealand (RMNZ)	Gold	15,000^{‡}
Nigeria (TCSN)	4× Platinum	400,000^{‡}
Switzerland (IFPI Switzerland)	Gold	10,000^{‡}
United Kingdom (BPI)	Platinum	600,000^{‡}
Streaming
Sweden (GLF)	Platinum	8,000,000^{†}
^{‡} Sales+streaming figures based on certification alone.^{†} Streaming-only figures based on certification alone.

== Release history ==
Release history for "For My Hand"
Region	Date	Format	Label	Ref.
Italy	11 July 2022	Contemporary hit radio	Atlantic	
