= Antytila =

Ukrainian musical group

Antytila Антитіла
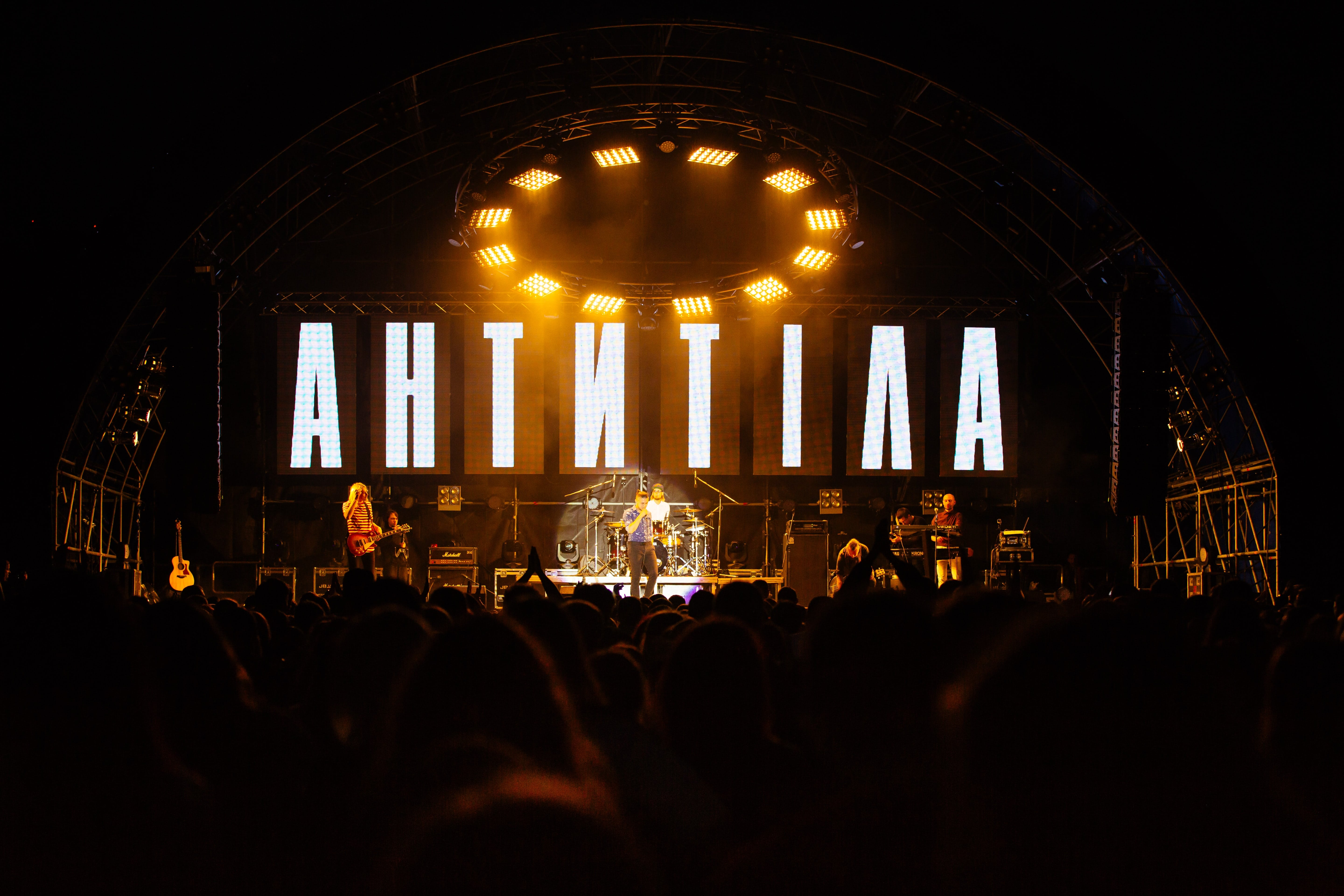
- Mega final of the "Sun" tour in Kyiv. May 25, 2017

Background information
- Origin: Kyiv, Ukraine
- Genres: Pop rock
- Years active: 2007–present
- Members: Taras Topolia; Serhii Vusyk; Mykhailo Chyrko; Dmytro Zholud; Dmytro Vodovozov
- Website: antytila.com

Antytila (Ukrainian: Антитіла) is a Ukrainian musical group. It includes Taras Topolia (vocals), Serhii Vusyk (keyboard, artistic director), Dmytro Zholud (guitar), and Dmytro Vodovozov (drums), Mykhailo Chyrko (bass).

== History ==
In 2018, Volodymyr Zelenskyy, the future president of Ukraine, participated in one of their videoclips, LEGO.

=== Russo-Ukrainian War ===
Shortly before the Russian invasion of Ukraine, the band joined the Territorial Defense Forces, having previously served as volunteers since the Russian occupation of Crimea in 2014. In March 2022, the band made an appeal to perform remotely in the Concert for Ukraine, a benefit concert raising funds for those affected by the Russian invasion. Their appeal included a message to singer Ed Sheeran via TikTok. The band were refused a place at the concert due to their association with the military. In response, Sheeran collaborated with the band on a remix of his song "2step", with profits from streams of the music video being donated to Music Saves UA, a fundraising project created to provide humanitarian aid in Ukraine.

On February 9, 2023, Antytila released the music video for their song "Fortetsia Bakhmut" (’Bakhmut fortress’) which has received nearly 30 million views on YouTube.

On May 25, 2023, the band presented the track "My Falcon" in two languages (Ukrainian and English), and the song became the soundtrack to the German-Finnish computer game Death from Above.

== Discography ==
- Buduvudu (2008)
- Vybyrai (2011)
- Nad poliusamy (2013)
- Vse krasyvo (2015)
- Sontse (2016)
- Hello (2019)
- MLNL (2022)
