= Sigue =

2022 single by J Balvin and Ed Sheeran

Single by J Balvin and Ed Sheeran
- Released: 25 March 2022
- Genre: Pop; reggaeton; dance
- Length: 2:39
- Label: Universal Latin
- Songwriters: José Osorio; Ed Sheeran; Marco Masís; Justin Quiles; Kevyn Moreno
- Producer: Tainy

J Balvin singles chronology
"Niño Soñador" (2022)	"Sigue" / "Forever My Love" (2022)	"Voodoo" (2022)

Ed Sheeran singles chronology
"Bam Bam" (2022)	"Sigue" / "Forever My Love" (2022)	"2step" (2022)

Music video
- "Sigue" on YouTube

"Sigue" is a song by Colombian singer J Balvin and British singer-songwriter Ed Sheeran. It was released as a single through Universal Music Latin Entertainment on 25 March 2022, concurrently with their other collaboration, "Forever My Love". The song was solely produced by Tainy.

== Background and composition ==
On 21 March 2022, through a social media post for promoting the two songs, Sheeran said that he and Balvin met in a gym in New York in 2021, which led to them having lunch and coffee and tea together that day, and then chatting with each other. He was performing shows in the area for Christmas at the time and the two artists met up in a recording studio and wrote "Sigue" and "Forever My Love". Sheeran added that "it was a proper challenge learning Spanish for this and I had so much fun doing it". About collaborating with Sheeran, Balvin stated that "I wanted him to come to the world of reggaeton and he invited me to his world as well" and "it was really cool hearing him in Spanish and we hope that you all love the songs as much as we do". Sheeran was also interviewed by the New Zealand channel Project NZ the week before the release of the songs and referred to his next release as "something else that's a bit more of a curveball" and that it would be releasing in ten days, but added that "I don't think it's gonna be a massive hit in New Zealand though" and "it's more gonna be a big hit somewhere else", giving a hint by stating that "when you hear it you'll understand". Writing for Billboard, Jason Lipshutz felt that "J Balvin and Ed Sheeran are both global superstars adept at crafting club-ready pop and heartfelt balladry, and on a new collaborative two-pack, the pair delivers two sides of their artistry while feeding off one another's energy" and "Sheeran sounds confident crooning in Spanish", adding that "Balvin offers bare emotion" with "a party atmosphere on the island-flavored" song. "Sigue" is a pop, reggaeton, and dance ballad that is set in the key of B minor.

== Music video ==
The official music video for "Sigue" premiered on Balvin's YouTube channel alongside the release of the song and "Forever My Love" on 25 March 2022. It shows the two artists having fun together in a luxury hotel.

== Charts ==
Chart performance for "Sigue"
Chart (2022)	Peak position
Argentina Hot 100 (Billboard)	42
Argentina Airplay (Monitor Latino)	16
Belgium (Ultratop 50 Wallonia)	47
Brazil (Pop Internacional)	7
Canada Hot 100 (Billboard)	63
Canada CHR/Top 40 (Billboard)	46
Chile Airplay (Monitor Latino)	9
Colombia Airplay (Monitor Latino)	2
Costa Rica (Monitor Latino)	11
Ecuador Airplay (Monitor Latino)	1
Global 200 (Billboard)	52
Guatemala (Monitor Latino)	7
Honduras (Monitor Latino)	1
Ireland (IRMA)	87
Italy (FIMI)	88
Mexico (Billboard Mexican Airplay)	2
Netherlands (Single Top 100)	95
New Zealand Hot Singles (RMNZ)	33
Nicaragua (Monitor Latino)	1
Paraguay (Monitor Latino)	18
Panama (Monitor Latino)	1
Peru Airplay (Monitor Latino)	13
Puerto Rico (Monitor Latino)	1
Portugal (AFP)	75
San Marino (SMRRTV Top 50)	33
Spain (PROMUSICAE)	76
Sweden (Sverigetopplistan)	99
Switzerland (Schweizer Hitparade)	34
UK Singles (OCC)	96
Uruguay (Monitor Latino)	15
US Billboard Hot 100	89
US Hot Latin Songs (Billboard)	7
US Latin Airplay (Billboard)	1
US Latin Rhythm Airplay (Billboard)	1

== Certifications ==
Certifications for "Sigue"
Region	Certification	Certified units/sales
Italy (FIMI)	Gold	50,000^{‡}
Spain (PROMUSICAE)	Gold	30,000^{‡}
^{‡} Sales+streaming figures based on certification alone.

== See also ==
- List of Billboard Hot Latin Songs and Latin Airplay number ones of 2022
