= List of top 10 singles in 2021 (Ireland) =

This is a list of singles that have peaked in the top 10 of the Irish Singles Chart in 2021, as compiled by the Official Charts Company on behalf of the Irish Recorded Music Association.

== Top-ten singles ==
Key

Symbol	Meaning
◁	Indicates single's top 10 entry was also its Irish Singles Chart top 100 debut

Artist(s)	Single	Peak	Peak date	Weeks at #1	Ref.
Little Mix	"Sweet Melody"◁	7	8 January	-	
Ed Sheeran	"Afterglow"	2	8 January	-	
Justin Bieber	"Anyone"◁	5	8 January	-	
CJ	"Whoopty"	10	8 January	-	
Olivia Rodrigo	"Drivers License" ◁	1	15 January	9	
SZA	"Good Days"	8	15 January	-	
Anne-Marie, KSI and Digital Farm Animals	"Don't Play" ◁	9	22 January	-	
Shane Codd	"Get Out My Head"	5	5 February	-	
Fredo featuring Dave	"Money Talks" ◁	8	5 February	-	
Doja Cat	"Streets"	9	5 February	-	
Master KG featuring Nomcebo Zikode	"Jerusalema"	4	12 February	-	
Lil Tjay and 6lack	"Calling My Phone" ◁	2	19 February	-	
Taylor Swift	"Love Story (Taylor's Version)" ◁	7	19 February	-	
HVME and Travis Scott	"Goosebumps"	4	5 March	-	
ATB, Topic and A7S	"Your Love (9PM)"	8	5 March	-	
Drake	"What's Next" ◁	7	12 March	-	
Drake featuring Lil Baby	"Wants and Needs" ◁	8	12 March	-	
Tiësto	"The Business"	1	19 March	1	
Nathan Evans, 220 Kid, Billen Ted	"Wellerman"	2	19 March	-	
Riton and Nightcrawlers featuring Mufasa & Hypeman	"Friday"	3	19 March	-	
KSI featuring Yungblud and Polo G	"Patience" ◁	8	19 March	-	
A1 x J1	"Latest Trends"	10	19 March	-	
Joel Corry, Raye and David Guetta	"Bed"	3	26 March	-	
Justin Bieber featuring Daniel Caesar and Giveon	"Peaches" ◁	1	26 March	1	
Justin Bieber	"Hold On"	8	26 March	-	
Lil Nas X	"Montero (Call Me by Your Name)" ◁	1	2 April	5	
Cardi B	"Up"	10	2 April	-	
Glass Animals	"Heat Waves"	5	16 April	-	
Polo G	"Rapstar" ◁	2	16 April	-	
The Weeknd	"Save Your Tears"	2	30 April	-	
Russ Millions and Tion Wayne	"Body" ◁	1	7 May	2	
Billie Eilish	"Your Power" ◁	3	7 May	-	
Doja Cat featuring SZA	"Kiss Me More" ◁	2	14 May	-	
Olivia Rodrigo	"Good 4 U" ◁	1	21 May	6	
Olivia Rodrigo	"Deja Vu" ◁	2	28 May	-	
Olivia Rodrigo	"Traitor" ◁	3	28 May	-	
BTS	"Butter" ◁	7	28 May	-	
Tom Grennan	"Little Bit of Love"	6	11 June	-	
Anne-Marie and Niall Horan	"Our Song" ◁	8	11 June	-	
Billie Eilish	"Lost Cause" ◁	9	11 June	-	
KSI	"Holiday" ◁	2	25 June	-	
Galantis, David Guetta and Little Mix	"Heartbreak Anthem"	5	2 July	-	
Måneskin	"Beggin'"	3	2 July	-	
Måneskin	"I Wanna Be Your Slave"	4	2 July	-	
Ed Sheeran	"Bad Habits" ◁	1	2 July	11	
Picture This	"Addict of Magic" ◁	10	2 July	-	
Mimi Webb	"Good Without"	7	9 July	-	
Olivia Rodrigo	"Favorite Crime" ◁	8	9 July	-	
Dave featuring Stormzy	"Clash" ◁	8	16 July	-	
Jonasu	"Black Magic"	4	23 July	-	
The Kid Laroi and Justin Bieber	"Stay" ◁	2	23 July	-	
Calvin Harris and Tom Grennan	"By Your Side"	8	23 July	-	
Dave	"Verdansk" ◁	9	30 July	-	
Billie Eilish	"Happier Than Ever" ◁	3	6 August	-	
Dermot Kennedy	"Better Days" ◁	4	6 August	-	
Becky Hill and David Guetta	"Remember"	3	20 August	-	
Doja Cat	"Need to Know"	8	20 August	-	
Rain Radio & DJ Craig Gorman	"Talk About"	9	20 August	-	
Tones and I	"Fly Away"	10	20 August	-	
Ed Sheeran	"Visiting Hours" ◁	8	27 August	-	
Kanye West	"Hurricane" ◁	7	3 September	-	
Kanye West	"Jail" ◁	9	3 September	-	
Drake featuring Lil Baby	"Girls Want Girls" ◁	3	10 September	-	
Drake featuring Travis Scott	"Fair Trade" ◁	4	10 September	-	
Drake	"Champagne Poetry" ◁	6	10 September	-	
Joel Corry and Jax Jones featuring Charli XCX and Saweetie	"Out Out"	2	17 September	-	
Ed Sheeran	"Shivers" ◁	1	17 September	5	
Lil Nas X and Jack Harlow	"Industry Baby" ◁	2	24 September	-	
Lil Nas X	"Thats What I Want" ◁	3	24 September	-	
Elton John and Dua Lipa	"Cold Heart (Pnau remix)"	2	8 October	-	
CKay	"Love Nwantiti (Ah Ah Ah)"	5	15 October	-	
Adele	"Easy on Me" ◁	1	22 October	8	
Coldplay and BTS	"My Universe"	10	22 October	-	
Ed Sheeran	"Overpass Graffiti" ◁	4	5 November	-	
Becky Hill and Topic	"My Heart Goes (La Di Da)"	6	12 November	-	
The Anxiety (Willow Smith and Tyler Cole)	"Meet Me at Our Spot"	4	12 November	-	
Taylor Swift	"All Too Well (Taylor's Version)" ◁	1	19 November	1	
Taylor Swift	"State of Grace (Taylor's Version)" ◁	7	19 November	-	
Taylor Swift	"Red (Taylor's Version)" ◁	9	19 November	-	
Adele	"Oh My God" ◁	3	26 November	-	
Adele	"I Drink Wine" ◁	5	26 November	-	
Ed Sheeran and Elton John	"Merry Christmas" ◁	1	24 December	2	
Shakin' Stevens	"Merry Christmas Everyone"	7	24 December	-	
Michael Bublé	"It's Beginning to Look a Lot Like Christmas"	7	31 December	-	

== Entries by artist ==
The following table shows artists who achieved two or more top 10 entries in 2021. The figures include both main artists and featured artists and the peak position in brackets.

Entries	Artist	Songs
6	Ed Sheeran	"Afterglow" (2), "Bad Habits" (1), "Visiting Hours" (8), "Shivers" (1), "Overpass Graffiti" (4), "Merry Christmas" (1)
5	Olivia Rodrigo	"Drivers License" (1), "Deja Vu" (2), "Good 4 U" (1), "Traitor" (3), "Favorite Crime" (8)
5	Drake	"What's Next" (7), "Wants and Needs" (8), "Girls Want Girls" (3), "Fair Trade" (4), "Champagne Poetry" (6)
4	Justin Bieber	"Anyone" (5), "Peaches" (1), "Hold On" (8), "Stay" (2)
4	Taylor Swift	"Love Story (Taylor's Version)" (7), "All Too Well (Taylor's Version)" (1), "State of Grace (Taylor's Version)" (7), "Red (Taylor's Version)" (9)
3	KSI	"Don't Play" (9), "Patience" (8), "Holiday" (2)
3	David Guetta	"Bed" (3), "Heartbreak Anthem" (5), "Remember" (3)
3	Dave	"Money Talks" (8), "Clash" (8), "Verdansk" (9)
3	Billie Eilish	"Your Power" (3), "Lost Cause" (9), "Happier Than Ever" (3)
3	Doja Cat	"Streets" (9), "Kiss Me More" (2), "Need to Know" (8)
3	Lil Nas X	"Montero (Call Me by Your Name)" (1), "Industry Baby" (2), "Thats What I Want" (3)
3	Adele	"Easy on Me" (1), "Oh My God" (3), "I Drink Wine" (5)
2	Polo G	"Patience" (8), "Rapstar" (2)
2	SZA	"Good Days" (8), "Kiss Me More" (2)
2	Little Mix	"Sweet Melody" (7), "Heartbreak Anthem" (5)
2	Måneskin	"I Wanna Be Your Slave" (4), "Beggin'" (3)
2	Tom Grennan	"Little Bit of Love" (6), "By Your Side" (8)
2	Joel Corry	"Bed" (3), "Out Out" (2)
2	Kanye West	"Hurricane" (7), "Jail" (9)
2	Lil Baby	"Wants and Needs" (8), "Girls Want Girls" (3)
2	Becky Hill	"Remember" (3), "My Heart Goes (La Di Da)" (6)
2	BTS	"Butter" (7), "My Universe" (10)
2	Elton John	"Cold Heart" (2), "Merry Christmas" (1)
2	Topic	"Your Love (9PM)" (8), "My Heart Goes (La Di Da)" (6)

== See also ==
- 2021 in music
- List of number-one singles of 2021 (Ireland)
