= Afterglow (disambiguation) =

Afterglow is an atmospheric phenomenon.

Afterglow may also refer to:

== Science and medicine ==
- An emission after an excitation; see phosphorescence
- Afterglow (gamma ray burst), fainter, fading, longer wavelength emission after a gamma ray burst
- Afterglow plasma, concept in plasma physics
- Afterglow (drug culture), concept in drug culture

== Film, television, and radio ==
- Afterglow (1997 film), starring Nick Nolte and Julie Christie
- Afterglow (1923 film), a British silent drama film
- "Afterglow", the seventeenth episode of the second season of That 70s Show
- Afterglow: A Last Conversation with Pauline Kael, a 2003 book about film critic Pauline Kael
- Afterglow, a jazz radio show produced by WFIU

== Music ==
- Afterglow (band), an American psychedelic band in the late 1960s
- Afterglow, a fictional band in the BanG Dream! franchise
- The Afterglow, a pop/rock band from Turin, Italy

=== Albums and EPs ===
- Afterglow (Electric Light Orchestra album), 1990
- Afterglow (Dr. John album), 1995
- Afterglow (Crowded House album), 1999
- Afterglow (Quench album), 2003
- Afterglow (Sarah McLachlan album), 2003
- Afterglow (Black Country Communion album), 2012
- Afterglow (Marcellus Hall & The Hostages album), 2013
- Afterglow (Soulfire Revolution album), 2015
- Afterglow (Ásgeir album), 2017
- After Glow (Carmen McRae album), 1957
- The Afterglow, a 2014 EP by Blackbear
- Afterglow (Sleep Theory album), 2025

=== Songs ===
- "Afterglow" (Tina Turner song), 1987
- "Afterglow" (Taxiride song), 2003
- "Afterglow" (INXS song), 2006
- "Afterglow" (Wilkinson song), 2013
- "Afterglow of Your Love", 1969
- "Afterglow (Ed Sheeran song)", 2020
- "Afterglow", by All Time Low from Last Young Renegade, 2017
- "Afterglow", by Car Seat Headrest from Nervous Young Man, 2013
- "Afterglow", by Chvrches from Every Open Eye, 2015
- "Afterglow", by Genesis from Wind & Wuthering, 1976
- "Afterglow", by John Frusciante and Josh Klinghoffer from A Sphere in the Heart of Silence, 2004
- "Afterglow", by José González from Vestiges & Claws, 2015
- "Afterglow", by The Mission from Sum and Substance, 1994
- "Afterglow", by The Servants from Disinterest, 1990
- "Afterglow", by Sunrise Avenue from Heartbreak Century, 2017
- "Afterglow", by Taylor Swift from Lover, 2019
- "Afterglow", by Travis from The Invisible Band, 2001
- "Afterglow", by Vertical Horizon from Burning the Days, 2009
- "Afterglow", by Tkay Maidza from Tkay, 2016
- "The Afterglow", by Silverstein from Dead Reflection, 2017

== Other uses ==
- Afterglow Vista, a mausoleum in Roche Harbor, Washington, United States
