= = (album) =

Studio album by Ed Sheeran
- Released: 29 October 2021
- Recorded: June 2017 – July 2021
- Genre: Pop
- Length: 48:23
- Labels: Asylum; Atlantic
- Producers: Sheeran; Johnny McDaid; Fred; Elvira Anderfjärd; Foy Vance; Joe Rubel; Romans; Steve Mac; Andrew Watt; Louis Bell

Ed Sheeran chronology
No.6 Collaborations Project (2019)	= (2021)	− (2023)

Singles from =
- 1. "Bad Habits" Released: 25 June 2021; 2. "Shivers" Released: 10 September 2021; 3. "Overpass Graffiti" Released: 29 October 2021; 4. "The Joker and the Queen" Released: 11 February 2022; 5. "2step" Released: 22 April 2022

= (Equals) is the fifth studio album by English singer-songwriter Ed Sheeran. It was released on 29 October 2021 through Asylum and Atlantic Records. The album was supported by five singles: "Bad Habits", "Shivers", "Overpass Graffiti", "The Joker and the Queen", and "2step". The song "Visiting Hours" was released as a promotional single.

Upon release, = received generally mixed reviews from music critics, who appreciated Sheeran's emerging sonic experimentation while criticising its production. The album reached number one in Australia, Belgium, Canada, Denmark, France, Germany, Ireland, Italy, Lithuania, the Netherlands, New Zealand, Scotland, Sweden, the United Kingdom, and the United States.

== Background and promotion ==
On 18 August 2021, Sheeran said there would be a "big announcement" the following day. On 19 August, he announced the album and its release date of 29 October on his social media accounts. He described the album as his "coming-of-age" record. To him, the album was a "really personal record and one that means a lot to me", citing changes in his life, including marriage, the birth of his daughter and experienced losses. The promotional single "Visiting Hours" was released alongside the announcement.

In an interview with Capital FM on 27 June 2021, Sheeran also stated that he would like to see the songs he made for the film Yesterday appear on a repackaged version of the album before he goes on tour for the record.

The Christmas edition of the album was released on 3 December 2021, containing a guest appearance from fellow English singer-songwriter Elton John on the song "Merry Christmas", while the standard edition does not have any guest appearances.

The tour edition of the album was released on 27 May 2022. It contains his two songs from the 2019 film Yesterday, "One Life" and "Penguins", and two new songs, "I Will Remember You" and "Welcome to the World". The reissue also contains the 2020 single "Afterglow", the single version of "The Joker and the Queen" featuring American singer-songwriter Taylor Swift, the single version of "2step" featuring American rapper Lil Baby, a remix of "Bad Habits" featuring British rock band Bring Me the Horizon, and his collaboration with Nigerian singer Fireboy DML, "Peru". A second remix of "2step" is also included in the reissue in several countries.

A French version of the album was released on 4 November 2022. This version contains "Peru", a remix of "2step" featuring Leto, "Bam Bam" by Camila Cabello featuring Sheeran, and a new single "Call on Me" by Vianney featuring Sheeran. A limited edition includes a DVD of the FNAC Live 2021 concert. The album sold 1.3 million copies worldwide in 2021, becoming the fifth best-selling album of that year.

== Singles ==
"Bad Habits" was released on 25 June 2021 as the album's lead single. "Bad Habits" reached number 1 on the UK Singles Chart, and number 2 on the Billboard Hot 100.

"Shivers" was released on 10 September 2021 as the album's second single. "Shivers" reached number 1 on the UK Singles Chart, and number 4 on the Billboard Hot 100.

"Overpass Graffiti" was released alongside the album on 29 October 2021 as the third single. "Overpass Graffiti" reached number 4 on the UK Singles Chart, and number 41 on the Billboard Hot 100. Sheeran performed the song for NPR's Tiny Desk Concert series on 26 October.

A remix of "The Joker and the Queen" featuring Taylor Swift was released as the album's fourth single on 11 February 2022. "The Joker and the Queen" reached number 2 on the UK Singles Chart, and number 21 on the Billboard Hot 100.

A remix of "2step" featuring Lil Baby was released as the album's fifth single on 22 April 2022. "2step" reached number 9 on the UK Singles Chart, and number 48 on the Billboard Hot 100.

=== Promotional singles ===
"Visiting Hours" was released on 19 August 2021 as the sole promotional single. It reached number 5 on the UK Singles Chart and number 75 on the Billboard Hot 100.

== Critical reception ==
Professional ratings
Aggregate scores
Source	Rating
AnyDecentMusic?	5.6/10
Metacritic	59/100
Review scores
Source	Rating
AllMusic	3.5/5 stars
Clash	6/10
Evening Standard	3/5 stars
The Guardian	3/5 stars
The Independent	3/5 stars
NME	3/5 stars
Pitchfork	3.6/10
Rolling Stone	3/5 stars
The Telegraph	4/5 stars
The Times	4/5 stars

= received mixed reviews from critics. On Metacritic, the album has a weighted average score of 59 out of 100 based on 13 reviews, indicating "mixed or average reviews".

AllMusic's Stephen Thomas Erlewine wrote that "Sheeran's melodies are soft yet insistent, and the production glistens with fair borrowed from younger, hipper artists who mine a similar blend of retro new wave and modern R&B, but he knows how to turn this stylish sound into something cozy and reassuring, which therefore "is the surest sign that Ed Sheeran has indeed grown up: he's not chasing trends, he's making music for people who have aged out of the clubs but have yet to wallow in nostalgia". Writing for Clash, Robin Murray rated the album 6 out of 10, explaining that the album "follows his mathematically minded opening trilogy, and it puts you in mind of completion, resolution, and conclusion. The album itself, however, offers little in the way of those things, thriving instead on a series of dichotomies – between the everyman and the star, the guitarist and the producer, between the humble pop savant and the brash stadium-filling star". David Smyth from Evening Standard wrote that "although there are a few quiet songs among the 14 here, and more than a few lyrics about the humble joy of staying home with his wife Cherry and their one-year-old daughter Lyra, this is no Taylor Swift-style slice of lockdown restraint".

The album received positive reception from audiences, with a 92% like ratio on Google.

== Commercial performance ==
= debuted at number one in the United Kingdom, selling 139,000 units in its first week, outperforming the rest of the week's Top 30 combined. It achieved the 3rd biggest opening week for an album of 2021 in the UK and the 2nd fastest selling album of 2021, behind Adele's 30. It later became the second best-selling album of 2021 in the UK with 432,000 sales.

The album debuted atop the Billboard 200 chart, becoming Sheeran's fourth chart-topping album in the United States. It opened with 118,000 album-equivalent units, of which 68,000 were pure sales.

== Track listing ==
Standard edition
No.	Title	Writer(s)	Producer(s)	Length
1.	"Tides"	Ed Sheeran; Johnny McDaid; Foy Vance	Sheeran; Vance; Joe Rubel; McDaid	3:15
2.	"Shivers"	Sheeran; McDaid; Kal Lavelle; Steve Mac	Sheeran; Fred; Mac	3:27
3.	"First Times"	Sheeran; David Hodges; Fred	Sheeran; Fred	3:05
4.	"Bad Habits"	Sheeran; McDaid; Fred	Sheeran; McDaid; Fred; Parisi^{[a]}	3:51
5.	"Overpass Graffiti"	Sheeran; McDaid; Fred	Sheeran; McDaid; Fred	3:56
6.	"The Joker and the Queen"	Sheeran; McDaid; Fred; Sam Roman	Sheeran; McDaid; Fred; Romans	3:05
7.	"Leave Your Life"	Sheeran	Sheeran; Elvira Anderfjärd	3:43
8.	"Collide"	Sheeran; McDaid; Fred; Ben Kweller	Sheeran; McDaid; Fred; Benji Gibson^{[a]}	3:30
9.	"2step"	Sheeran; Hodges; Louis Bell; Andrew Wotman	Bell; Watt	2:33
10.	"Stop the Rain"	Sheeran	Sheeran; Rubel; Fred	3:23
11.	"Love in Slow Motion"	Sheeran; McDaid; Natalie Hemby	Sheeran; McDaid; Fred; Rubel^{[a]}	3:10
12.	"Visiting Hours"	Sheeran; McDaid; Amy Wadge; Anthony Clemons; Kim Lang Smith; Michael Pollack; Scott Carter	Sheeran; McDaid; Parisi^{[a]}	3:35
13.	"Sandman"	Sheeran; McDaid	Sheeran; McDaid	4:19
14.	"Be Right Now"	Sheeran; McDaid; Fred	Sheeran; McDaid; Fred; Parisi^{[a]}	3:31
Total length:				48:23

Tour edition
No.	Title	Writer(s)	Producer(s)	Length
15.	"Afterglow"	Sheeran; Hodges; Fred	Sheeran; Hodges; Parisi	3:05
16.	"One Life"	Sheeran; McDaid; Mac	Sheeran; Mac	3:57
17.	"Penguins"	Sheeran; McDaid	Sheeran; McDaid	4:09
18.	"I Will Remember You"	Sheeran	Sheeran; Rubel	3:35
19.	"Welcome to the World"	Sheeran	Rubel	2:57
20.	"The Joker and the Queen" (featuring Taylor Swift)	Sheeran; McDaid; Fred; Romans; Taylor Swift	Sheeran; McDaid; Fred; Romans	3:05
21.	"2step" (featuring Lil Baby)	Sheeran; Hodges; Bell; Wotman; Lil Baby	Bell; Watt	2:43
22.	"Bad Habits" (featuring Bring Me the Horizon)	Sheeran; McDaid; Fred	Sheeran; McDaid; Fred; Jordan Fish; Oliver Sykes	4:11
23.	"Peru" (with Fireboy DML)	Sheeran; Fireboy DML; Ivory Scott IV; Shizzi	Shizzi; Kolten Perine	3:07
Total length:				82:40

Notes

- ^{^a} signifies an additional producer
- The French edition includes "2step" (featuring Leto), "Peru" (with Fireboy DML), "Call on Me" (with Vianney), and "Bam Bam" (with Camila Cabello).

== Personnel ==
Musicians

- Ed Sheeran – vocals (all tracks), backing vocals (1, 4–6, 8, 10, 11, 14), bass (1, 10, 11), boy soprano, drums (1); guitar (1, 2, 9), pizzicato violin (2), acoustic guitar (4, 5, 11, 12), percussion (4, 11), keyboards (10), ukulele (13)
- Foy Vance – piano (1, 10), backing vocals, guitar (1)
- Joe Rubel – drum programming, guitar (1, 10); programming (1, 10, 11); bass, piano (1); additional programming (2), strings programming (3, 6), keyboards (10, 11), acoustic guitar, percussion (11)
- Johnny McDaid – piano (1, 11–13), guitar (2), acoustic guitar (4, 11, 14), backing vocals (5, 8, 11, 12, 14), bass (5, 8, 12), electric guitar (5, 8, 12, 14), keyboards (5, 8, 11–13), programming (5, 11–13), percussion (8), drums (11), glockenspiel, marimba (13)
- Matt Glasbey – programming (1, 10)
- Fred – bass (2–8, 10, 14), drums (2, 4, 5, 8, 10, 11, 14), guitar (2, 4), keyboards (2, 4–8, 10, 14), programming (2, 4, 5, 14), piano (3, 4, 7, 11), backing vocals (4, 5, 8, 10, 11), acoustic guitar (5), string arrangement (6)
- Chris Laws – drums, programming (2)
- Steve Mac – keyboards (2)
- Parisi – additional strings (3)
- Ashok Klouda – cello (3, 6)
- Tim Lowe – cello (3, 6)
- Victoria Harrild – cello (3, 6)
- Leon Bosch – double bass (3, 6)
- Matthew Sheeran – string arrangement (3, 6), programming (6)
- Eoin Schmidt-Martin – viola (3)
- Laurie Anderson – viola (3)
- Rebecca Lowe – viola (3)
- Gary Pomeroy – viola (3)
- Meghan Cassidy – viola (3)
- Ann Bielby – viola (3)
- Kirsty Mangan – violin (3)
- Kathy Gowers – violin (3)
- Thomas Gould – violin (3)
- Michael Jones – violin (3)
- Marije Johnston – violin (3)
- Jan Regulski – violin (3)
- Anna Blackmur – violin (3)
- Antonia Kesel – violin (3)
- Beatrix Lovejoy – violin (3)
- Warren Zielinksi – violin (3)
- Samantha Wickramasinghe – violin (3)
- Ciaran McCabe – violin (3)
- Matthew Denton – violin (3)
- Martyn Jackson – violin (3)
- Iain Archer – slide guitar (4)
- Hal Ritson – additional vocals, additional programming, bass, keyboards (5); programming (8)
- Richard Adlam – additional programming, percussion (8)
- Louise Clare Marshall – additional vocals (5)
- Sam Roman – guitar, piano (6)
- Elvira Anderfjärd – backing vocals, bass, drums, keyboards, programming (7)
- Graham Archer – backing vocals (8)
- Will Reynolds – backing vocals (8), keyboards (8, 11, 12) acoustic guitar (11), programming (11, 12), electric guitar (12)
- Benjy – drums (8)
- Louis Bell – drums, keyboards, programming (9)
- Andrew Watt – guitar, keyboards, programming (9)
- Giampaolo Parisi – drums (11), programming (11, 14), sound effects (14)
- Marco Parisi – keyboards, piano (11, 12); horn (12), strings (14)
- Aine McDaid – backing vocals (12), flute (13)
- Jimmy Barnes – backing vocals (12)
- Jimmy Carr – backing vocals (12)
- Josh McDaid – backing vocals (12)
- Kylie Minogue – backing vocals (12)
- Maev McDaid – backing vocals (12), harp (13)
- Pauline McDaid – backing vocals (12)
- Jack Parisi – programming (12)
- Michael Peter Olsen – cello (13)
- Owen Pallett – string arrangement, viola, violin (13)

Technical

- Ed Sheeran – executive production
- Johnny McDaid – executive production, engineering (2, 4–6, 8, 11–14)
- Fred – executive production, engineering (4–8, 11, 14)
- Stuart Hawkes – mastering
- Mark "Spike" Stent – mixing
- Joe Rubel – engineering (1, 2, 10, 11), recording (2), string engineering (3, 6)
- Matt Glasbey – engineering (1, 3, 6, 10, 11)
- Robert Sellens – engineering (1, 10, 11)
- Chris Laws – engineering, recording (2)
- Dan Pursey – engineering, recording, vocal production (2)
- Graham Archer – engineering (2, 4–8, 10–14), vocal production (2–6, 8, 10–14)
- Paul LaMalfa – engineering (9)
- Aine McDaid – recording (13)
- Kylie Minogue – vocal engineering, additional vocal recording (12)
- Steve Mac – vocal production (2)
- Matt Wolach – mixing assistance
- Kieran Beardmore – mixing assistance (1–3, 5–14)
- Charlie Holmes – mixing assistance (1–3, 5–14)
- Camden Clarke – engineering assistance (1, 10, 11)
- Marta Di Nozzi – engineering assistance (3, 6)
- Neil Dawes – engineering assistance (3, 6)
- Will Reynolds – engineering assistance (4–6, 8, 11–13)
- Hal Ritson – additional engineering (5)
- Kevin Shirley – additional vocal engineering (12)

== Charts ==
=== Weekly charts ===
Chart performance for =
Chart (2021–2022)	Peak position
Australian Albums (ARIA)	1
Austrian Albums (Ö3 Austria)	1
Belgian Albums (Ultratop Flanders)	2
Belgian Albums (Ultratop Wallonia)	1
Canadian Albums (Billboard)	1
Croatian International Albums (HDU)	1
Czech Albums (ČNS IFPI)	1
Danish Albums (Hitlisten)	1
Dutch Albums (Album Top 100)	1
Finnish Albums (Suomen virallinen lista)	2
French Albums (SNEP)	1
German Albums (Offizielle Top 100)	1
Greek Albums (IFPI)	9
Hungarian Albums (MAHASZ)	1
Icelandic Albums (Tónlistinn)	3
Irish Albums (Official Charts)	1
Italian Albums (FIMI)	1
Japanese Albums (Oricon)	9
Japanese Hot Albums (Billboard Japan)	4
Lithuanian Albums (AGATA)	1
New Zealand Albums (RMNZ)	1
Norwegian Albums (VG-lista)	1
Polish Albums (ZPAV)	3
Portuguese Albums (AFP)	1
Scottish Albums (Official Charts)	1
Slovak Albums (ČNS IFPI)	1
Spanish Albums (Promusicae)	1
Swedish Albums (Sverigetopplistan)	1
Swiss Albums (Schweizer Hitparade)	1
UK Albums (Official Charts)	1
Uruguayan Albums (CUD)	20
US Billboard 200	1

=== Year-end charts ===
2021 year-end chart performance for =
Chart (2021)	Position
Australian Albums (ARIA)	6
Austrian Albums (Ö3 Austria)	7
Belgian Albums (Ultratop Flanders)	14
Belgian Albums (Ultratop Wallonia)	16
Danish Albums (Hitlisten)	26
Dutch Albums (Album Top 100)	9
French Albums (SNEP)	22
German Albums (Offizielle Top 100)	11
Hungarian Albums (MAHASZ)	13
Irish Albums (IRMA)	5
Italian Albums (FIMI)	42
New Zealand Albums (RMNZ)	18
Norwegian Albums (VG-lista)	36
Polish Albums (ZPAV)	60
Spanish Albums (PROMUSICAE)	33
Swedish Albums (Sverigetopplistan)	23
Swiss Albums (Schweizer Hitparade)	4
UK Albums (OCC)	2

2022 year-end chart performance for =
Chart (2022)	Position
Australian Albums (ARIA)	5
Austrian Albums (Ö3 Austria)	4
Belgian Albums (Ultratop Flanders)	9
Belgian Albums (Ultratop Wallonia)	23
Canadian Albums (Billboard)	2
Danish Albums (Hitlisten)	4
Dutch Albums (Album Top 100)	2
French Albums (SNEP)	13
German Albums (Offizielle Top 100)	8
Hungarian Albums (MAHASZ)	71
Icelandic Albums (Tónlistinn)	18
Italian Albums (FIMI)	35
Japanese Download Albums (Billboard Japan)	63
Lithuanian Albums (AGATA)	16
New Zealand Albums (RMNZ)	6
Portuguese Albums (AFP)	98
Spanish Albums (PROMUSICAE)	39
Swedish Albums (Sverigetopplistan)	3
Swiss Albums (Schweizer Hitparade)	8
UK Albums (OCC)	2
US Billboard 200	15

2023 year-end chart performance for =
Chart (2023)	Position
Australian Albums (ARIA)	39
Belgian Albums (Ultratop Flanders)	75
Belgian Albums (Ultratop Wallonia)	167
Canadian Albums (Billboard)	18
Danish Albums (Hitlisten)	41
Dutch Albums (Album Top 100)	35
French Albums (SNEP)	26
New Zealand Albums (RMNZ)	26
Swedish Albums (Sverigetopplistan)	51
UK Albums (OCC)	19
US Billboard 200	72

2024 year-end chart performance for =
Chart (2024)	Position
French Albums (SNEP)	109
UK Albums (OCC)	81

== Certifications ==
Certifications for =
Region	Certification	Certified units/sales
Australia (ARIA)	Platinum	70,000^{‡}
Austria (IFPI Austria)	2× Platinum	30,000^{‡}
Brazil (Pro-Música Brasil)	Platinum	40,000^{‡}
Canada (Music Canada)	7× Platinum	560,000^{‡}
Denmark (IFPI Danmark)	3× Platinum	60,000^{‡}
France (SNEP)	3× Platinum	300,000^{‡}
Germany (BVMI)	Platinum	200,000^{‡}
Italy (FIMI)	2× Platinum	100,000^{‡}
New Zealand (RMNZ)	4× Platinum	60,000^{‡}
Poland (ZPAV)	2× Platinum	40,000^{‡}
Portugal (AFP)	Gold	7,500^{^}
Singapore (RIAS)	Gold	5,000^{*}
Spain (Promusicae)	Gold	20,000^{‡}
United Kingdom (BPI)	4× Platinum	1,270,695
United States (RIAA)	Platinum	1,000,000^{‡}
^{*} Sales figures based on certification alone.^{^} Shipments figures based on certification alone.^{‡} Sales+streaming figures based on certification alone.

== Release history ==
Release history and formats for =
Region	Date	Format(s)	Label	Ref.
Various	29 October 2021	CD; digital download; streaming; vinyl; cassette	Asylum; Atlantic	
