= First Times =

Song by Ed Sheeran

from the album =
- Released: 29 October 2021
- Genre: Folk pop
- Length: 3:05
- Label: Asylum; Atlantic
- Songwriters: Ed Sheeran; Johnny McDaid; Fred Gibson
- Producers: Sheeran; Fred Again

"First Times" is a song by English singer-songwriter Ed Sheeran from his fifth studio album = (2021), appearing as the third track on its tracklisting. It was written and produced by Sheeran, Johnny McDaid and Fred Again. After the album's release, it charted at number 31, 50, 33, 126, 27, and 52 on Australia, Canada, Denmark, France, New Zealand and Sweden, respectively as well as charting at number 48 on the Global 200.

== Background ==
Sheeran wrote the song after he took the inspiration from drinking beer with his wife backstage at Wembley Stadium. He shared that "First Times" was actually inspired by a quiet moment amid the chaos and heightened expectations of one of the biggest nights of his life—the evening he played Wembley Stadium. After all the excitement, he says it was a simple moment with wife Cherry Seaborn that really made it all real. He wrote "I was just on stage, and I was like 'It's actually just a concert. It was a good concert, but just a concert,'" he said. "Coming backstage, my wife giving me a beer, then me sitting down, and we chatted over a beer each; I felt everything. This is like real life." He explained that's where the entire first verse of the song comes from. "That sort of took me back and I wrote this song thinking about all the simplest things that seemed so insignificant at the time, like our first glass of wine sitting on a step in Brooklyn opposite a pizza bar, and that at the time was just whatever.," he shared. "Now, it's become tradition. We go back to New York and that's what we do every single time." "Life is full of small things that seem so insignificant at the time, but they are massive in the grand scheme of things. We chase after these things in life that we think will fill the void, whereas the void is actually being filled by all these tiny, beautiful things," he continued. "You go 'I need to do this thing because this is what I think will be the making of me and this is going to be it' when actually it's all around you and you just have to take it in sometimes."

== Promotion and release ==
On 19 August 2021, Sheeran announced his fourth studio album, =, in which the song is listed on the tracklist. On 29 October 2021, "First Times" was released alongside other album tracks that appeared on the album =.

== Lyric video ==
A lyric video for the song was uploaded on Sheeran's YouTube account on 29 October 2021 along with the other lyric videos of the songs that appeared on the tracklisting of =.

== Credits and personnel ==
- Ed Sheeran – vocals, production, songwriting, writing
- Joe Rubel – strings programming
- Johnny McDaid – production, songwriting, writing
- Fred – production, bass, piano, songwriting, writing
- Parisi – additional strings
- Ashok Klouda – cello
- Tim Lowe – cello
- Victoria Harrild – cello
- Leon Bosch – double bass
- Matthew Sheeran – string arrangement
- Eoin Schmidt-Martin – viola
- Laurie Anderson – viola
- Rebecca Lowe – viola
- Gary Pomeroy – viola
- Meghan Cassidy – viola
- Ann Bielby – viola
- Kirsty Mangan – violin
- Kathy Gowers – violin
- Thomas Gould – violin
- Michael Jones – violin
- Marije Johnston – violin
- Jan Regulski – violin
- Anna Blackmur – violin
- Antonia Kesel – violin
- Beatrix Lovejoy – violin
- Warren Zielinksi – violin
- Samantha Wickramasinghe – violin
- Ciaran McCabe – violin
- Matthew Denton – violin
- Martyn Jackson – violin
- Hal Ritson – additional vocals, additional programming, bass
- Richard Adlam – additional programming
- Sam Roman – guitar
- Stuart Hawkes – mastering
- Mark "Spike" Stent – mixing
- Joe Rubel – string engineering
- Matt Glasbey – engineering
- Matt Wolach – mixing assistance
- Kieran Beardmore – mixing assistance
- Charlie Holmes – mixing assistance
- Marta Di Nozzi – engineering assistance
- Neil Dawes – engineering assistance

== Charts ==
Chart performance for "First Times"
| Chart (2021) | Peak position |
|---|---|
| Australia (ARIA) | 31 |
| Canada Hot 100 (Billboard) | 50 |
| Czech Republic Singles Digital (ČNS IFPI) | 52 |
| Denmark (Tracklisten) | 33 |
| France (SNEP) | 126 |
| Global 200 (Billboard) | 48 |
| Hungary (Single Top 40) | 33 |
| New Zealand (Recorded Music NZ) | 27 |
| Portugal (AFP) | 129 |
| Slovakia (Singles Digitál Top 100) | 52 |
| South Africa (RISA) | 64 |
| Sweden (Sverigetopplistan) | 52 |
| UK Streaming (Official Charts Company) | 17 |
| US Bubbling Under Hot 100 (Billboard) | 6 |

== Certifications ==
Certifications for "First Times"
| Region | Certification | Certified units/sales |
|---|---|---|
| Canada (Music Canada) | Gold | 40,000^{‡} |
| New Zealand (RMNZ) | Gold | 15,000^{‡} |
| United Kingdom (BPI) | Silver | 200,000^{‡} |
^{‡} Sales+streaming figures based on certification alone.
