= The Joker and the Queen =

2022 single by Ed Sheeran featuring Taylor Swift

Single by Ed Sheeran featuring Taylor Swift

from the album = (Tour Edition)
- Released: 11 February 2022
- Studio: Fieldwork (London and Suffolk); Stamford Street (London); Promised Land (London); Abbey Road (London); Pixel (London)
- Genre: Folk
- Length: 3:05 (original and remix version); 2:37 (remix radio edit)
- Label: Asylum; Atlantic
- Songwriters: Ed Sheeran; Taylor Swift; Johnny McDaid; Fred Gibson; Sam Roman
- Producers: Ed Sheeran; Fred; Johnny McDaid; Romans

Ed Sheeran singles chronology
"Peru" (2021)	"The Joker and the Queen" (2022)	"Bad Habits" (2022)

Taylor Swift singles chronology
"Message in a Bottle" (2021)	"The Joker and the Queen" (2022)	"Anti-Hero" (2022)

Music video
- "The Joker and the Queen" on YouTube

"The Joker and the Queen" is a song by English singer-songwriter Ed Sheeran, taken from his fifth studio album, =, that was released on 29 October 2021 by Asylum and Atlantic Records. Sheeran wrote and produced the song with Johnny McDaid, Fred, and Sam Roman. A duet version of the song, featuring American singer-songwriter Taylor Swift, was released on 11 February 2022 as the album's fourth single.

The single is a slow-paced folk ballad driven by a cinematic piano, waltz tempo, and 1950s-inspired strings. It marks the fourth collaboration between Sheeran and Swift, following "Everything Has Changed" (2012), "End Game" (2017), and "Run" (2021). An accompanying music video, a sequel to the video of "Everything Has Changed" with the same actors, was released on the same day as the song. The single was praised by critics for its pleasant sound. Commercially, it charted at number two in Japan and the UK; number three in Singapore; number five in Ireland, Lithuania and Malaysia; number 11 in Australia, Belgium, and Vietnam; number 12 in Canada; number 13 in India; number 15 in the Philippines; and number 19 in Hong Kong and Switzerland.

== Development and release ==
=== Background ===
"The Joker and the Queen" is a song written and produced by English singer-songwriter Ed Sheeran, alongside his collaborators Johnny McDaid, Fred and Sam Romans. After writing "Bad Habits", Sheeran thought that he finished writing for the day before Fred played him a piano instrumental created by Romans, which Fred found "very beautiful" but was never able to expand it into a song. Sheeran then spent about 20 minutes writing down various metaphors, including coming up with the song's title and the line "I fold, you saw my hand, you let me win, you put the cards on the table." Sheeran thought that the song was too easy to write and disliked it. However, Sheeran's brother Matthew created a string composition for the song, which Sheeran admired for sounding like an "old classic that had been around since the '50s".

The song was recorded at Fieldwork Studio in London and Suffolk, Stamford Street in London, Promised Land Music Studios in London, Abbey Road Studios in London and Pixel in London. The mixing was handled by Mark "Spike" Stent at the Mixsuite while it was mastered by Stuart Hawkes at Metropolis Studios in London. "The Joker and the Queen" was released on 29 October 2021 as the sixth track on Sheeran's fifth studio album =.

=== Duet version ===
Shortly after = was released, Sheeran confirmed that a new recording of the song featuring an American singer had been recorded and was set to be released in January 2022; however, he cautioned that it was not official as it had not been cleared for release. American singer-songwriter Taylor Swift, a frequent collaborator of Sheeran, began hinting that she was the featured artist on the song, using several easter eggs such as in Swift's music video for "I Bet You Think About Me" where she carves the equals sign on a wedding cake; the video's director Blake Lively promoted the video with the joker emoji on social media. Swift also released playing cards in promotion of her 2021 re-recorded album Red (Taylor's Version). Additionally, in Sheeran's "Overpass Graffiti" music video, Swift's name can be seen in a newspaper column as well as on a leather jacket that Sheeran wears which also has joker and queen print.

In December 2021, Sheeran confirmed that the duet "The Joker and the Queen" would be released as the fourth single from = in 2022. On 1 February 2022, Sheeran revealed on social media that he was signing some CDs for a new project, which featured an artwork with a joker and a queen that resembled Swift. Four days later, the song credits in the lyric video for "The Joker and the Queen" showed "(feat. Taylor Swift)" in the title. Sheeran officially revealed that the remix of "The Joker and the Queen" would feature Swift at the 42nd Brit Awards on 8 February 2022 in a red carpet interview with LADbible. Sheeran announced the single via social media the following day, set for release on 11 February 2022. The single marked the fourth collaboration between Sheeran and Swift, after "Everything Has Changed" (2013), "End Game" (2017) and "Run" (2021).

== Music and lyrics ==
"The Joker and the Queen" is a folk waltz. It has been described as a "cinematic" piano ballad. In the duet remix, Swift takes over the second verse with a female perspective, replacing Sheeran's original lyrics. The lyrics explain love using a card game analogy.

== Critical reception ==
The track received positive reviews. Melissa Ruggieri of USA Today said the duet is a tender, heartfelt ballad, accentuated by "a sumptuous piano melody with a cinematic swoosh of strings". Billboard writer Hannah Dailey wrote that the song is a delicate piano ballad about rekindling lost love. Jason Brow of Hollywood Life described it as "another great addition to the Ed Sheeran and Taylor Swift lore". Michael Major of BroadwayWorld dubbed the track a beautifully reimagined version of the original album track. Robin Murray of Clash called it an "undiverting ear-worm", claiming it was "pleasant but definitely not distracting, sitting more in Sheeran's MOR vein than Taylor's recent reclamation work." He said Swift and Sheeran are "relishing classicism, utilising form to craft a gentle delight". Gulf News labelled it a "soothing romantic ballad" and a "Valentine's Day gift to (their) fans".

== Commercial performance ==
Upon the release of =, the album version of "The Joker and the Queen" debuted at number 66, 78, and 99 on Australia's ARIA Singles, Canadian Hot 100, and the Billboard Global 200 charts, respectively. Following the release of the duet version, "The Joker and the Queen" reached a new peak of number 11 in Australia, and debuted at numbers two and five on the UK Singles and Irish Singles charts, respectively. It debuted at number 15 on Billboard Philippine Songs chart and reached number 10 on the Billboard Global 200.

== Music video ==
The music video of "The Joker and the Queen" continued the storyline from the video for Swift's 2013 single featuring Sheeran, "Everything Has Changed"; the child actors who resembled Swift and Sheeran in the latter video—Ava Ames and Jack Lewis, respectively—play the grown-up versions of themselves in the former. The video shows a text message between the two characters, which is a real text-exchange between Sheeran and Swift that was shared to Swift's Instagram account in 2015. A screenshot of the "Everything Has Changed" music video also appears as a framed photograph in "The Joker and the Queen" video.

== Live performances ==
Sheeran performed "The Joker and the Queen" at the 42nd Brit Awards on 8 February 2022, and in Paris, Stade de France on 30 July 2022.

== Personnel ==
Credits adapted from Spotify and the liner notes of =.

- Ed Sheeran – vocals, songwriting, production, backing vocals
- Taylor Swift – vocals, songwriting (remix only)
- Fred – songwriting, production, engineering, string arrangement, bass, keys
- Johnny McDaid – songwriting, production, engineering
- Romans – songwriting, production, guitar, piano
- Mark "Spike" Stent – mixing
- Matt Wolach – mix assisting
- Kieran Beardmorre – mix assisting
- Charlie Holmes – mix assisting
- Graham Archer – engineering, vocal production
- Matt Glasbey – engineering
- Neil Dawes – assistant engineering
- Will Reynolds – assistant engineering
- Marta Di Nozzi – assistant engineering
- Matthew Sheeran – string arrangement, programming
- Joe Rubel – string recording, string programming
- Marco Parisi – additional strings
- Peter Gregson – conductor
- Tom Kelly – copy
- Ashok Klouda – cello
- Victoria Harrild – cello
- Tim Lowe – cello
- Leon Bosch – double bass
- Hilary Skewes – fixed
- Stuart Hawkes – mastering

== Charts ==
=== Weekly charts ===
Weekly chart performance for "The Joker and the Queen" (Note: Combined chart statistics of solo and duet versions of "The Joker and the Queen")
Chart (2021–2022)	Peak position
Australia (ARIA)	11
Austria (Ö3 Austria Top 40)	35
Belgium (Ultratop 50 Flanders)	11
Canada Hot 100 (Billboard)	12
Canada AC (Billboard)	27
Canada Hot AC (Billboard)	31
Denmark (Tracklisten)	33
France (SNEP)	170
Germany (GfK)	37
Global 200 (Billboard)	10
Greece (IFPI)	69
Hong Kong (Billboard)	19
Hungary (Single Top 40)	38
Iceland (Tónlistinn)	21
India International Singles (IMI)	13
Ireland (IRMA)	5
Japan Hot Overseas (Billboard Japan)	2
Lithuania (AGATA)	5
Malaysia (RIM)	5
Malaysia (Billboard)	12
Mexico (Billboard Ingles Airplay)	21
Netherlands (Dutch Top 40)	33
Netherlands (Single Top 100)	78
New Zealand (Recorded Music NZ)	26
Norway (VG-lista)	29
Philippines (Billboard)	15
Portugal (AFP)	51
Singapore (RIAS)	3
Slovakia Airplay (ČNS IFPI)	25
South Africa (TOSAC)	42
South Korea (Gaon)	191
Sweden (Sverigetopplistan)	27
Switzerland (Schweizer Hitparade)	19
Taiwan (Billboard)	22
UK Singles (OCC)	2
US Billboard Hot 100	21
US Adult Contemporary (Billboard)	16
US Adult Pop Airplay (Billboard)	13
US Pop Airplay (Billboard)	30
Vietnam Hot 100 (Billboard)	11

=== Year-end charts ===
Year-end chart performance for "The Joker and the Queen"
Chart (2022)	Position
Belgium (Ultratop 50 Flanders)	146

== Certifications ==
Certifications for "The Joker and the Queen"
Region	Certification	Certified units/sales
Austria (IFPI Austria)	Gold	15,000^{‡}
Canada (Music Canada)	Platinum	80,000^{‡}
New Zealand (RMNZ)	Gold	15,000^{‡}
United Kingdom (BPI)	Gold	400,000^{‡}
^{‡} Sales+streaming figures based on certification alone.

== Release history ==
Release dates and formats for "The Joker and the Queen"
Region	Date	Format(s)	Label	Ref.
Various	11 February 2022	Digital download; streaming	Asylum; Atlantic	
United States	14 February 2022	Adult contemporary radio	Atlantic	
Italy	18 February 2022	Radio airplay	Warner	
Various	18 February 2022	CD	Asylum; Atlantic	
