= Afterglow (Soulfire Revolution album) =

Live album by Soulfire Revolution
- Released: August 21, 2015
- Genres: Worship, Christian EDM, CCM, Christian rock pop rock
- Length: 61:39
- Label: Dream
- Producer: Anthony Catacoli

Soulfire Revolution chronology
Revival (2013)	Afterglow (2015)

Afterglow is the first live album by Soulfire Revolution. Dream Records released the album on August 21, 2015.

== Critical reception ==
Professional ratings
Review scores
Source	Rating
365 Days of Inspiring Media	4/5 stars
CCM Magazine	3.5/5 stars
Christian Music Review	3.5/5
New Release Today	3.5/5 stars
Worship Leader	3.5/5 stars

Matt Conner, indicating in a three and a half star review for CCM Magazine, describes, "These dance-hall ready anthems are easily accessible and accomplish their purpose of ushering vibrant celebration." Giving a three and a half star review at Worship Leader, Jeremy Armstrong states, "Afterglow contains a beauty and a zeal that will ignite and inspire lives for the kingdom of heaven." Joshua Andre, awarding the album four stars for 365 Days of Inspiring Media, writes, they "have expertly and skilfully crafted 11 tracks of honest worship songs to God, and that’s not an easy task to do straight up by any means, especially since it’s a live project, which is recorded flawlessly." Rating the album three and a half stars from New Release Today, Mark Ryan says, "Although they haven't shown much growth musically since the debut, the music they are writing and singing is doing what it needs to do: bringing glory to God." Kelly Meade, indicating in a 3.5 out of five review by Christian Music Review, describes, "The overall impression of this album is that while some of the tracks feel a slightly repetitive and the lyrics risk being upstaged by the accompanying music at times, the message of God’s love for us and longing to experience His presence in our lives is still found within the words."

== Track listing ==
No.	Title	Length
1.	"Arise"	4:16
2.	"Lost in Your Love"	3:43
3.	"We Will Rise Up"	5:55
4.	"You Have Won My Heart"	6:53
5.	"Fire Fall Down"	5:45
6.	"An Encounter"	3:11
7.	"Set Us Free"	3:59
8.	"Set the World on Fire"	3:34
9.	"Back Into Your Arms"	5:45
10.	"Just One Touch"	6:52
11.	"Reveal Yourself"	7:24
12.	"Afterglow"	4:22
Total length:		61:39
