= Tides (Ed Sheeran song) =

Song by Ed Sheeran

from the album =
- Released: 29 October 2021
- Genre: Pop rock
- Length: 3:15
- Label: Asylum; Atlantic
- Songwriters: Ed Sheeran; Johnny McDaid; Foy Vance
- Producers: Sheeran; Vance; Joe Rubel; McDaid

"Tides" is a song by English singer-songwriter Ed Sheeran. It is the first track on his fifth studio album, = (2021). It was written and produced by Sheeran, Johnny McDaid and Foy Vance with Joe Rubel as its additional producer. After the album's release, it charted at number 43, 63, 169, 83, and 75 on Australia, Canada, France, South Africa and Sweden, respectively as well as charting at number 68 on the Global 200.

== Background ==
Sheeran has said that "Tides" is about spending time with his family and forgetting about the chaos of life when he is with his loved ones: "The verses are about what went on in my career and personal life. The verses are pure chaos, while the chorus is completely A cappella - the lyrics are 'Time stops to still. When you are in my arms, it always will.' It's like once the door closes and you're alone with your family the chaos is shut out. It's an interesting song because it's so loud and so quiet and so loud and so quiet, I really like it."

== Promotion and release ==
On 19 August 2021, Sheeran announced his fourth studio album, =, in which the song is listed on the tracklist. On 29 October 2021, "Tides" was released alongside other album tracks that appeared on the album =.

== Lyric video ==
A lyric video for the song was uploaded on Sheeran's YouTube account on 29 October 2021 along with the other lyric videos of the songs that appeared on the tracklisting of =.

== Credits and personnel ==
- Ed Sheeran – vocals, backing vocals, bass, drums, guitar, production, songwriting, writing
- Foy Vance – piano, backing vocals, guitar, production, songwriting, writing
- Joe Rubel – guitar, programming, bass, piano, engineering, production
- Johnny McDaid – piano, production, songwriting, writing
- Matt Glasbey – programming
- Stuart Hawkes – mastering
- Mark "Spike" Stent – mixing
- Matt Glasbey – engineering
- Robert Sellens – engineering
- Kieran Beardmore – mixing assistance
- Charlie Holmes – mixing assistance
- Camden Clarke – engineering assistance

== Charts ==
Chart performance for "Tides"
| Chart (2021) | Peak position |
|---|---|
| Australia (ARIA) | 43 |
| Canada Hot 100 (Billboard) | 63 |
| France (SNEP) | 169 |
| Global 200 (Billboard) | 68 |
| New Zealand Hot Singles Chart (Recorded Music NZ) | 3 |
| South Africa (RISA) | 83 |
| Sweden (Sverigetopplistan) | 75 |
| UK Streaming (Official Charts Company) | 21 |

== Certifications ==
Certifications for "Tides"
| Region | Certification | Certified units/sales |
|---|---|---|
| United Kingdom (BPI) | Silver | 200,000^{‡} |
^{‡} Sales+streaming figures based on certification alone.
