= Revival (Soulfire Revolution album) =

Studio album by Soulfire Revolution
- Released: August 13, 2013
- Genre: Contemporary Christian music, praise & worship
- Length: 51:36
- Label: Sparrow

Soulfire Revolution chronology
| Revival (2013) | Afterglow (2015) |

Revival is the first studio album by Christian Contemporary/Praise & Worship band Soulfire Revolution, which was released on August 13, 2013 by Sparrow Records. The album garnered critical acclamation from critics and commercial successes by the charts.

== Background ==
Revival is the debut studio album from the group Soulfire Revolution. The album was released on August 13, 2013 by Sparrow Records.

== Critical reception ==
Professional ratings
Review scores
| Source | Rating |
|---|---|
| CCM Magazine | 2/5 stars |
| Christian Music Review | 4.5/5 stars |
| Christian Music Zine | 4.5/5 stars |
| CM Addict | 4/5 stars |
| Cross Rhythms | 10/10 squares |
| Indie Vision Music | 3/5 stars |
| Louder Than the Music | 5/5 stars |
| New Release Tuesday | 4.5/5 stars |

Revival garnered critical acclaim from music critic that reviewed the album. At New Release Tuesday, Mark Ryan called it "a powerful worship album." Joshua Andre of Christian Music Zine told that this album "is something to savour many times." At Louder Than the Music, Jono Davies felt that "Everything seems fresh." Laura Chambers at Christian Music Review stated that "this is a winner" because of all the elements involved. At CM Addict, Brianne Bellomy said that from the starting to the closing "these songs will lift your soul and awaken your heart." Jonathan Andre of Indie Vision Music wrote "Well done guys for such a riveting and compelling worship experience!" At Cross Rhythms, Stephen Curry felt that "A second, third and fourth listen only serves to underline the musical invention, lyrical passion and emotional resonance of a fine set of songs." However, Grace S. Aspinwall of CCM Magazine called the album "lackluster and a bit simplistic", but told that "More creative energy and intricate instrumentation will work well for them in the future."

== Commercial performance ==
For the Billboard charting week of August 31, 2013, Revival was the No. 11 most sold album in the breaking and entry chart of the United States by the Top Heatseekers and it was the No. 25 Top Christian Album as well.

== Track listing ==
Revival
| No. | Title | Length |
|---|---|---|
| 1. | "Revival" (featuring Kim Walker-Smith) | 3:57 |
| 2. | "Hallowed Be Your Name" | 4:02 |
| 3. | "What an Awesome God" | 3:43 |
| 4. | "Spirit Break Out" (featuring tobyMac) | 4:25 |
| 5. | "Glorious" | 4:40 |
| 6. | "Count the Stars" (featuring Martin Smith) | 4:59 |
| 7. | "Awaken My Heart" | 4:58 |
| 8. | "We Sing" | 3:58 |
| 9. | "So Much More" | 4:05 |
| 10. | "Place of Surrender" | 4:33 |
| 11. | "All Yours" | 3:48 |
| 12. | "Just One Drop" | 4:28 |
| Total length: | | 51:36 |

== Charts ==
| Chart (2013) | Peak position |
|---|---|
| US Christian Albums (Billboard) | 25 |
| US Top Heatseekers Albums (Billboard) | 11 |
