= Shivers (Ed Sheeran song) =

2021 single by Ed Sheeran

Single by Ed Sheeran

from the album =
- Released: 10 September 2021
- Recorded: 2021
- Genre: Dance-pop
- Length: 3:27
- Label: Asylum; Atlantic
- Songwriters: Ed Sheeran; Steve McCutcheon; Kal Lavelle; Johnny McDaid
- Producers: Ed Sheeran; Steve Mac; Fred Again

Ed Sheeran singles chronology
"Bad Habits" (2021)	"Shivers" (2021)	"Overpass Graffiti" (2021)

Music video
- "Shivers" on YouTube

Audio sample
- "Shivers": file; help

"Shivers" is a song by English singer-songwriter Ed Sheeran, released through Asylum Records and Atlantic Records on 10 September 2021 as the second single from his fifth studio album, = (2021). "Shivers" entered atop the charts in the United Kingdom and Ireland, dethroning Sheeran's previous single "Bad Habits" after eleven consecutive weeks at the summit in both countries. The song also topped the charts in Austria, Germany, Sweden and Switzerland and peaked at number four on the Billboard Hot 100.

== Background ==
Sheeran referred to the song while explaining why the album title was = instead of –, as fans had predicted, in which he said: "I was making the record and I wrote a song called 'Shivers' and I was like, 'This doesn't really feel like [Minus]". Sheeran wrote "Shivers" at the end of the Divide tour, when he set up a studio at a rented farm in Suffolk where he had his last date of the tour. It took him three days to write the song, which was unusually long for him, as he felt the song "was too special to get wrong".

== Release and promotion ==
On 19 August 2021, Sheeran announced his fourth studio album, =, in which the song is listed on the tracklist. He later announced the cover art and release date of the song on 2 September 2021. He also revealed that "Shivers" was originally intended to be the lead single for the album instead of its current lead single, "Bad Habits". A preview of the song was also listed. Sheeran announced its accompanying music video and a teaser video of it on Labour Day, 6 September 2021.

== Critical reception ==
On 2 September 2021, the same day Sheeran announced the song, Jonathan Heaf from the United Kingdom branch of GQ in Sheeran's hometown, described the song as "a sexy, rocketing song that includes hand claps in the bridge and is music to dance to with your best friends after three too many tequilas".

== Music video and lyric video ==
=== Music video ===
A music video was released along with the song on 10 September 2021, starring Sheeran and AnnaSophia Robb. It has over 400 million views as of November 2025. Like his previous video, "Bad Habits", it was directed by Dave Meyers. In the music video, Sheeran meets Robb at a diner and starts going through wild fantasies with her, including getting revived in a morgue after a text from her that he was waiting for finally arrives, dancing together in a bird-filled hotel, and fighting off some goons (with Sheeran suddenly wearing knight armor in the midst of the fight). In some scenes in the music video, Sheeran wears sequins and feathers.

=== Lyric video ===
The lyric video for "Shivers" was released on 13 September 2021 and has over 65 Million views.

== Track listing ==
- Digital download, streaming and CD single
1. "Shivers" – 3:27
- Digital download and streaming – Acoustic Version
1. "Shivers" (Acoustic Version) – 3:26
- Digital download and streaming – Navos Remix
1. "Shivers" (Navos Remix) – 2:35
- Digital download and streaming – Ofenbach Remix
1. "Shivers" (Ofenbach Remix) – 3:07
- Digital download and streaming – Alok Remix
1. "Shivers" (Alok Remix) – 2:52
- Digital download and streaming – Jax Jones Remix
1. "Shivers" (Jax Jones Remix) – 3:27
- Digital download and streaming – Heavy-K Remix
1. "Shivers" (Heavy-K Remix) – 5:40
- Digital download and streaming – Dillon Francis Remixes
1. "Shivers" (Dillon Francis Main Mix) – 2:07
2. "Shivers" (Dillon Francis Club Mix) – 2:07
- Digital download and streaming – featuring Jessi and SUNMI
1. "Shivers" (featuring Jessi and SUNMI) – 3:27
- Digital download and streaming – featuring Feduk and Slava Marlow
1. "Shivers" (featuring Feduk and Slava Marlow) – 2:46

== Credits and personnel ==
Credits adapted from Spotify and Tidal.

- Ed Sheeran – vocals, songwriting, production, guitar, pizzicato violin
- Johnny McDaid – songwriting, unknown vocals, guitar
- Kal Lavelle – songwriting
- Steve Mac – songwriting, production, keyboard, vocal production
- Fred – production, bass, drums, guitar, keyboard, programming
- Charlie Holmes – assistant mixing
- Chris Laws – drums, programming, unknown vocals, recording
- Dan Pursey – vocal production, unknown vocals, recording
- Graham Archer – unknown vocals, vocal production
- Joe Rubel – unknown vocals, recording, additional programming
- Kieran Beardmore – assistant mixing
- Mark "Spike" Stent – mixing
- Matt Wolach – assistant mixing
- Stuart Hawkes – mastering

== Charts ==
=== Weekly charts ===
2021–2024 weekly chart performance for "Shivers"
Chart (2021–2024)	Peak position
Argentina Hot 100 (Billboard)	62
Australia (ARIA)	2
Austria (Ö3 Austria Top 40)	1
Belarus Airplay (TopHit)	133
Belgium (Ultratop 50 Flanders)	2
Belgium (Ultratop 50 Wallonia)	4
Brazil (Top 100 Brasil)	71
Bulgaria Airplay (PROPHON)	1
Canada Hot 100 (Billboard)	2
Canada AC (Billboard)	1
Canada CHR/Top 40 (Billboard)	1
Canada Hot AC (Billboard)	1
CIS Airplay (TopHit)	29
Croatia International Airplay (Top lista)	2
Czech Republic (Billboard)	14
Czech Republic Airplay (ČNS IFPI)	6
Czech Republic Singles Digital (ČNS IFPI)	5
Denmark (Tracklisten)	2
El Salvador (ASAP EGC)	9
Estonia Airplay (TopHit)	149
Euro Digital Song Sales (Billboard)	2
Finland (Suomen virallinen lista)	2
France (SNEP)	10
Germany (GfK)	1
Global 200 (Billboard)	3
Greece International (IFPI)	9
Hungary (Rádiós Top 40)	17
Hungary (Single Top 40)	8
Hungary (Stream Top 40)	7
Iceland (Billboard)	23
Iceland (Tónlistinn)	3
India International (IMI)	15
Ireland (IRMA)	1
Israel International Airplay (Media Forest)	3
Italy (FIMI)	12
Japan (Japan Hot 100)	49
Kazakhstan Airplay (TopHit)	53
Lebanon (Lebanese Top 20)	2
Latvia Airplay (TopHit)	197
Lithuania (AGATA)	7
Luxembourg (Billboard)	4
Malaysia (RIM)	19
Mexico Airplay (Billboard)	15
Netherlands (Dutch Top 40)	4
Netherlands (Single Top 100)	6
New Zealand (Recorded Music NZ)	3
Norway (VG-lista)	3
Panama Airplay (Monitor Latino)	9
Poland Airplay (ZPAV)	3
Portugal (AFP)	11
Romania Airplay (UPFR)	6
Russia Airplay (TopHit)	97
San Marino Airplay (SMRTV Top 50)	1
Singapore (RIAS)	3
Slovakia (Billboard)	8
Slovakia Airplay (ČNS IFPI)	2
Slovakia Singles Digital (ČNS IFPI)	2
South Africa (TOSAC)	13
South Korea (Gaon)	113
Spain (Promusicae)	37
Sweden (Sverigetopplistan)	1
Switzerland (Schweizer Hitparade)	1
Taiwan (Billboard)	16
UK Singles (Official Charts)	1
US Billboard Hot 100	4
US Adult Contemporary (Billboard)	2
US Adult Pop Airplay (Billboard)	1
US Dance Airplay (Billboard)	20
US Pop Airplay (Billboard)	4
Vietnam Hot 100 (Billboard)	57

2026 weekly chart performance for "Shivers"
Chart (2026)	Peak position
Lithuania Airplay (TopHit)	81

=== Monthly charts ===
Monthly chart performance for "Shivers"
Chart (2021–2024)	Peak position
CIS Airplay (TopHit)	29
Kazakhstan Airplay (TopHit)	69
Lithuania Airplay (TopHit)	76
Romania Airplay (TopHit)	61

=== Year-end charts ===
2021 year-end chart performance for "Shivers"
Chart (2021)	Position
Australia (ARIA)	32
Austria (Ö3 Austria Top 40)	27
Belgium (Ultratop Flanders)	34
Belgium (Ultratop Wallonia)	49
Canada (Canadian Hot 100)	49
Croatia (HRT)	87
Denmark (Tracklisten)	23
France (SNEP)	108
Germany (Official German Charts)	33
Global 200 (Billboard)	118
Hungary (Single Top 40)	36
Hungary (Stream Top 40)	43
Iceland (Tónlistinn)	73
Ireland (IRMA)	22
Netherlands (Dutch Top 40)	24
Netherlands (Single Top 100)	41
Norway (VG-lista)	39
Poland (ZPAV)	41
Portugal (AFP)	132
Sweden (Sverigetopplistan)	30
Switzerland (Schweizer Hitparade)	29
UK Singles (OCC)	15
US Adult Top 40 (Billboard)	45

2022 year-end chart performance for "Shivers"
Chart (2022)	Position
Australia (ARIA)	6
Austria (Ö3 Austria Top 40)	5
Belgium (Ultratop 50 Flanders)	25
Belgium (Ultratop 50 Wallonia)	37
Brazil (Pro-Música Brasil)	197
Canada (Canadian Hot 100)	4
CIS Airplay (TopHit)	77
Denmark (Tracklisten)	10
Germany (Official German Charts)	5
Global 200 (Billboard)	5
Hungary (Dance Top 40)	73
Hungary (Single Top 40)	48
Hungary (Stream Top 40)	56
Italy (FIMI)	85
Lithuania (AGATA)	26
Netherlands (Single Top 100)	32
New Zealand (Recorded Music NZ)	7
Poland (ZPAV)	88
Sweden (Sverigetopplistan)	8
Switzerland (Schweizer Hitparade)	4
UK Singles (OCC)	5
US Billboard Hot 100	5
US Adult Contemporary (Billboard)	4
US Adult Top 40 (Billboard)	6
US Mainstream Top 40 (Billboard)	19

2023 year-end chart performance for "Shivers"
Chart (2023)	Position
Australia (ARIA)	24
Austria (Ö3 Austria Top 40)	58
CIS Airplay (TopHit)	170
Denmark (Tracklisten)	66
Germany (Official German Charts)	87
Global 200 (Billboard)	43
New Zealand (Recorded Music NZ)	31
Romania Airplay (TopHit)	105
Switzerland (Schweizer Hitparade)	28
UK Singles (OCC)	38
US Adult Contemporary (Billboard)	9

2024 year-end chart performance for "Shivers"
Chart (2024)	Position
Lithuania Airplay (TopHit)	42

2025 year-end chart performance for "Shivers"
Chart (2025)	Position
Lithuania Airplay (TopHit)	67

== Certifications ==
Certifications for "Shivers"
Region	Certification	Certified units/sales
Australia (ARIA)	8× Platinum	560,000^{‡}
Austria (IFPI Austria)	5× Platinum	150,000^{‡}
Brazil (Pro-Música Brasil)	3× Platinum	120,000^{‡}
Canada (Music Canada)	Diamond	800,000^{‡}
Denmark (IFPI Danmark)	4× Platinum	360,000^{‡}
France (SNEP)	Diamond	333,333^{‡}
Germany (BVMI)	2× Platinum	800,000^{‡}
Italy (FIMI)	3× Platinum	300,000^{‡}
New Zealand (RMNZ)	7× Platinum	210,000^{‡}
Poland (ZPAV)	Diamond	250,000^{‡}
Portugal (AFP)	3× Platinum	30,000^{‡}
Spain (Promusicae)	3× Platinum	180,000^{‡}
United Kingdom (BPI)	5× Platinum	3,000,000^{‡}
United States (RIAA)	2× Platinum	2,000,000^{‡}
Streaming
Japan (RIAJ)	Platinum	100,000,000^{†}
^{‡} Sales+streaming figures based on certification alone.^{†} Streaming-only figures based on certification alone.

== Release history ==
Release dates and formats for "Shivers"
Region	Date	Format(s)	Version	Label	Ref.
Various	10 September 2021	Digital download; streaming; CD	Original	Atlantic	
United States	13 September 2021	Adult contemporary radio	Original	Atlantic	
United States	14 September 2021	Contemporary hit radio	Original	Atlantic	
Various	1 October 2021	Digital download; streaming	Acoustic	Atlantic	
Various	1 October 2021	Digital download; streaming	Navos Remix	Atlantic	
Various	8 October 2021	Digital download; streaming	Ofenbach Remix	Atlantic	
Various	11 October 2021	Digital download; streaming	Alok Remix	Atlantic	
Various	25 October 2021	Digital download; streaming	Jax Jones Remix	Atlantic	
Various	12 November 2021	Digital download; streaming	Heavy-K Remix	Atlantic	
Various	12 November 2021	Digital download; streaming	Dillon Francis Remixes	Atlantic	
Various	24 November 2021	Digital download; streaming	featuring Jessi and Sunmi	Atlantic	
Various	17 December 2021	Digital download; streaming	featuring Feduk and Slava Marlow	Atlantic	
