= Bad Habits (Ed Sheeran song) =

2021 single by Ed Sheeran

- Digital cover (Note: On release the cover art for the digital single was initially the same cover art as the CD single with no text on it)

Single by Ed Sheeran

from the album =
- Released: 25 June 2021
- Recorded: January 2021
- Genre: Dance-pop; synth-pop
- Length: 3:51
- Label: Asylum; Atlantic
- Songwriters: Ed Sheeran; Fred Gibson; Johnny McDaid
- Producers: Ed Sheeran; Fred Again; Johnny McDaid

Ed Sheeran singles chronology
| "Afterglow" (2020) | "Bad Habits" (2021) | "Shivers" (2021) |

Alternative cover
- CD and cassette single cover

Music video
- "Bad Habits" on YouTube

"Bad Habits" is a song by English singer-songwriter Ed Sheeran. It was released on 25 June 2021, through Asylum and Atlantic Records, as the lead single from his fifth studio album, = ("Equals"). The song marked his first solo release from an album in over four years. A limited edition CD and cassette single were also released. Music critics compared its sound and style to the works of the Weeknd, as well as Bronski Beat. Lyrically, the song is about addiction.

"Bad Habits" was a commercial success, peaking at number one in 28 countries including Australia, Belgium, Canada, Germany, Hungary, New Zealand, Switzerland and South Africa, becoming the official first number-one hit on the newly launched South African music charts. The song proved to be particularly successful in both the United Kingdom and Ireland, as it spent eleven consecutive weeks at the top of both the UK Singles Chart and Irish Singles Chart and also became the best-selling single of the year in both countries. In the United States, the song peaked at number two on the Billboard Hot 100. The song also topped the Global 200.

A UK drill remix made by Fumez the Engineer featuring British rappers Tion Wayne and Central Cee was released on 12 August 2021. Following his performance with Bring Me the Horizon at the 2022 BRIT Awards, the pair announced they were releasing a heavy metal studio version of the track on 17 February 2022. This version of the song was later featured on the Tour deluxe edition of =.

== Background ==
A slower acoustic song was planned to be released as the lead single from Sheeran's upcoming fifth studio album =. However, when the easing of COVID-19 pandemic restrictions were announced in England in early 2021, Sheeran chose to record "Bad Habits" and release it instead; "I don't know if the world needs a depressing sad, slow acoustic song when [the country is] opening up ", Sheeran said. He wrote the song in January 2021 to "surprise people" and "make something that was totally different" to what is expected of him.

Sheeran later explained in a Rolling Stone cover story that the song is about "addiction issues". He pointed out: "If you sing that on a piano really slowly, it's like a confessional song about addiction". Sheeran declined to elaborate upon his own bad habits, except for hard liquor. He finally realized it was time to get his drinking issues under control when his wife Cherry was pregnant with their first daughter, and she expressed her concern that he might be too intoxicated to safely drive her to the hospital when it was time to give birth.

== Release ==
On 23 April 2021, Sheeran was spotted in what appeared to be a zombie or vampire costume on a music video set in London, leading to widespread speculation about an upcoming music release. Sheeran himself confirmed the pictures to be genuine by posting outtakes of the video shoot on his social media pages in June 2021. On 25 May, he uploaded a picture of himself sitting next to a giant Snorlax pillow, with a caption on the picture above him saying "6/25", hinting at a release on that date. On 4 June, he began teasing the single release on his social media accounts, as well as announcing a performance at TikTok's UEFA Euro 2020 show with David Beckham on 25 June. Sheeran announced the single on 11 June. A promotional image of the single cover appeared on the Tate Modern in London.

== Composition and reception ==
"Bad Habits"
"Bad Habits" is a dance-pop and synth-pop song in which critics compare the song to the works of the Weeknd.

"Bad Habits" is a dance-pop and synth-pop track. Sheet music for this song is in the key of B minor with a tempo of 126 beats per minute. Sheeran's vocals range from the note of G_{3} to the note of B_{4}.

"Bad Habits" was met with mixed reviews from critics. Alexis Petridis of The Guardian gave the song four out of five stars, describing it as "a certain smash that's ready for the Weeknd". Nick Levine of NME gave the track three out of five stars, calling it "neither a misfire nor a surefire winner," and compared the sound style to Bronski Beat works, especially "Smalltown Boy". The Independent's Adam White was less impressed, giving "the stilted comeback" two out of five stars and saying Sheeran was "letting the toplines do the work and rummaging through Abel Tesfaye's leftovers." Quinn Moreland of Pitchfork derided the song as "painfully predictable", writing that it "aspires for Abel but settles for anonymity".

== Accolades ==
Awards and nominations for "Bad Habits"
| Year | Organization | Award | Result | Ref(s) |
|---|---|---|---|---|
| 2021 | MTV Video Music Awards | Video of the Year | Nominated | |
| 2021 | MTV Video Music Awards | Best Choreography | Nominated | |
| 2021 | MTV Video Music Awards | Best Art Direction | Nominated | |
| 2021 | MTV Video Music Awards | Song of Summer | Nominated | |
| 2021 | MTV Millennial Awards Brazil | Global Hit | Nominated | |
| 2021 | UK Music Video Awards | Best Visual Effects in a Video | Nominated | |
| 2021 | LOS40 Music Awards | Best International Song | Won | |
| 2021 | LOS40 Music Awards | Best International Video | Won | |
| 2021 | MTV Europe Music Awards | Best Song | Won | |
| 2021 | MTV Europe Music Awards | Best Video | Nominated | |
| 2022 | Grammy Awards | Song of the Year | Nominated | |

== Commercial performance ==
In the United States, "Bad Habits" debuted at number five on the Billboard Hot 100, with 38.8 million airplay audience impressions, 17.7 million streams and 33,200 copies sold. It opened at number two on Digital Song Sales and number six on Streaming Songs, and surged 36–11 on Radio Songs. The song became Sheeran's eighth top 10 in the US and first since 2019. On the chart dated 28 August 2021, the song reached a new peak at number two behind "Stay" by the Kid Laroi and Justin Bieber. The song ranked at number one on the Top Triller US Chart dated to 10 July 2021. The chart highlights the biggest songs on Triller based on a formula blending the amount of views of videos containing a respective songs, the level of engagement with those videos and the raw total of videos uploaded featuring each song.

== Music video ==
Sheeran flying in the music video for "Bad Habits"

The music video for "Bad Habits" was directed by Dave Meyers and filmed at the Catford Centre in Catford, South East London. It was uploaded on 25 June 2021. The music video portrays Sheeran as a vampire in a hot pink suit. The video starts in a beauty salon with Sheeran as a vampire, withering a flower before flying across chaos-ridden streets. He joins with several other monsters in doing various activities amidst the panicking crowd, including attacking them for the fun of it and handing out a balloon to a monster child, until the sun begins to rise. Most of the monsters go into hiding, with a few vaporized by the sunlight, except for Sheeran, who transforms back into his normal human self, playing the guitar as the video ends. The black cat in the video is a reference to the Catford Cat at the entrance to the shopping Centre. The video concept received comparisons to Michael Jackson's Thriller.

Sheeran said he wanted the video to "play on the nature of habits in a fantastical way so I decided on vampires." It was inspired by the song's lyrics and American television series Buffy the Vampire Slayer. Madison Bloom of Pitchfork described Sheeran as "the worst monster in the history of pop music", pointing out that the video "constantly suggests the potential for violence and gore but never commits." As of November 2024, the music video has amassed over 650 million views on YouTube.

== Live performances ==
Sheeran gave his first live performance of "Bad Habits" on 28 June 2021, on The Late Late Show with James Corden. On 30 June, Sheeran performed the song on The One Show. Sheeran performed the song on GMA Network's All-Out Sundays on 15 August.

== Track listing ==
- Digital download, streaming and CD single
1. "Bad Habits" – 3:51
- Digital download and streaming – Acoustic Version
1. "Bad Habits" (Acoustic Version) – 3:52
- Digital download and streaming – MEDUZA Remix
1. "Bad Habits" (MEDUZA Remix) – 3:14
- Digital download and streaming – Joel Corry Remix
1. "Bad Habits" (Joel Corry Remix) – 3:09
- Digital download and streaming – The Remixes
1. "Bad Habits" (Jubël Remode) – 2:59
2. "Bad Habits" (Kooldrink Amapiano Remix) – 5:27
3. "Bad Habits" (SHAUN Remix) – 3:44
4. "Bad Habits" (Ovy on the Drums Remix) – 3:30
- Digital download and streaming – Fumez the Engineer Remix
1. "Bad Habits" (Fumez the Engineer Remix featuring Tion Wayne and Central Cee) – 3:42
- Cassette single
1. "Bad Habits" – 3:51
2. "Bad Habits" (Acoustic Version) – 3:52

== Credits and personnel ==
Credits adapted from Tidal.

- Ed Sheeran – vocals, songwriting, production, acoustic guitar, percussion
- Fred Gibson – songwriting, production, backing vocals, bass, drums, guitar, keyboards, piano, programming, engineering
- Johnny McDaid – songwriting, production, acoustic guitar, engineering
- Graham Archer – vocal production, engineering
- Iain Archer – slide guitar
- Will Reynolds – engineering assistance
- Mark "Spike" Stent – mixing
- Matt Wolach – mixing assistance
- Stuart Hawkes – mastering

== Charts ==
=== Weekly charts ===
Weekly chart performance for "Bad Habits"
| Chart (2021–2024) | Peak position |
|---|---|
| Argentina Hot 100 (Billboard) | 17 |
| Australia (ARIA) | 1 |
| Austria (Ö3 Austria Top 40) | 1 |
| Belarus Airplay (TopHit) | 64 |
| Belgium (Ultratop 50 Flanders) | 1 |
| Belgium (Ultratop 50 Wallonia) | 1 |
| Bolivia Airplay (Monitor Latino) | 8 |
| Brazil Airplay (Top 100 Brasil) | 34 |
| Bulgaria Airplay (PROPHON) | 1 |
| Canada Hot 100 (Billboard) | 1 |
| Canada AC (Billboard) | 1 |
| Canada CHR/Top 40 (Billboard) | 1 |
| Canada Hot AC (Billboard) | 1 |
| Chile Airplay (Monitor Latino) | 17 |
| CIS Airplay (TopHit) | 1 |
| Costa Rica Airplay (Monitor Latino) | 16 |
| Croatia International Airplay (Top lista) | 1 |
| Czech Republic Airplay (ČNS IFPI) | 1 |
| Czech Republic Singles Digital (ČNS IFPI) | 2 |
| Denmark (Tracklisten) | 1 |
| Dominican Republic (SODINPRO) | 43 |
| Ecuador Airplay (Monitor Latino) | 17 |
| El Salvador Airplay (Monitor Latino) | 8 |
| Estonia Airplay (TopHit) | 159 |
| Euro Digital Song Sales (Billboard) | 1 |
| Finland (Suomen virallinen lista) | 1 |
| France (SNEP) | 4 |
| Germany (GfK) | 1 |
| Global 200 (Billboard) | 1 |
| Greece International (IFPI) | 4 |
| Hungary (Dance Top 40) | 2 |
| Hungary (Rádiós Top 40) | 1 |
| Hungary (Single Top 40) | 1 |
| Hungary (Stream Top 40) | 1 |
| Iceland (Tónlistinn) | 1 |
| India International (IMI) | 4 |
| Ireland (IRMA) | 1 |
| Israel International Airplay (Media Forest) | 1 |
| Italy (FIMI) | 6 |
| Japan Hot 100 (Billboard) | 32 |
| Kazakhstan Airplay (TopHit) | 27 |
| Lebanon (Lebanese Top 20) | 2 |
| Lithuania (AGATA) | 2 |
| Luxembourg (Billboard) | 7 |
| Malaysia (RIM) | 13 |
| Mexico (Billboard Mexican Airplay) | 1 |
| Moldova Airplay (TopHit) | 37 |
| Netherlands (Dutch Top 40) | 1 |
| Netherlands (Single Top 100) | 2 |
| New Zealand (Recorded Music NZ) | 1 |
| Norway (VG-lista) | 1 |
| Panama Airplay (Monitor Latino) | 9 |
| Poland Airplay (ZPAV) | 1 |
| Portugal (AFP) | 1 |
| Puerto Rico Airplay (Monitor Latino) | 14 |
| Romania (UPFR) | 1 |
| Russia Airplay (TopHit) | 1 |
| Singapore Songs (Billboard) | 16 |
| Singapore (RIAS) | 2 |
| Slovakia Airplay (ČNS IFPI) | 1 |
| Slovakia Singles Digital (ČNS IFPI) | 2 |
| South Africa Streaming (TOSAC) | 1 |
| South Korea (Gaon) | 12 |
| Spain (PROMUSICAE) | 26 |
| Sweden (Sverigetopplistan) | 2 |
| Switzerland (Schweizer Hitparade) | 1 |
| Taiwan (Billboard) | 25 |
| Ukraine Airplay (TopHit) | 3 |
| UK Singles (Official Charts) | 1 |
| Uruguay Airplay (Monitor Latino) | 9 |
| US Billboard Hot 100 | 2 |
| US Adult Contemporary (Billboard) | 1 |
| US Adult Pop Airplay (Billboard) | 1 |
| US Dance Airplay (Billboard) | 1 |
| US Pop Airplay (Billboard) | 2 |
| US Rhythmic Airplay (Billboard) | 24 |
| Vietnam Hot 100 (Billboard) | 71 |

=== Monthly charts ===
Monthly chart performance for "Bad Habits"
| Chart (2021–2023) | Peak position |
|---|---|
| Belarus Airplay (TopHit) | 70 |
| CIS Airplay (TopHit) | 1 |
| Czech Republic (Rádio Top 100) | 1 |
| Czech Republic (Singles Digitál Top 100) | 2 |
| Kazakhstan Airplay (TopHit) | 39 |
| Moldova Airplay (TopHit) | 53 |
| Romania Airplay (TopHit) | 63 |
| Russia Airplay (TopHit) | 1 |
| Slovakia (Rádio Top 100) | 1 |
| Slovakia (Singles Digitál Top 100) | 2 |
| Ukraine Airplay (TopHit) | 6 |

2024 monthly chart performance for "Bad Habits"
| Chart (2024) | Peak position |
|---|---|
| Lithuania Airplay (TopHit) | 85 |

2025 monthly chart performance for "Bad Habits"
| Chart (2025) | Peak position |
|---|---|
| Lithuania Airplay (TopHit) | 86 |

=== Year-end charts ===
2021 year-end chart performance for "Bad Habits"
| Chart (2021) | Position |
|---|---|
| Australia (ARIA) | 7 |
| Austria (Ö3 Austria Top 40) | 2 |
| Belgium (Ultratop Flanders) | 10 |
| Belgium (Ultratop Wallonia) | 3 |
| Bulgaria Airplay (PROPHON) | 10 |
| Brazil Streaming (Pro-Música Brasil) | 198 |
| Canada (Canadian Hot 100) | 7 |
| CIS Airplay (TopHit) | 4 |
| Denmark (Tracklisten) | 1 |
| France (SNEP) | 14 |
| Germany (Official German Charts) | 2 |
| Global 200 (Billboard) | 15 |
| Hungary (Dance Top 40) | 27 |
| Hungary (Rádiós Top 40) | 25 |
| Hungary (Single Top 40) | 7 |
| Hungary (Stream Top 40) | 5 |
| Ireland (IRMA) | 1 |
| Italy (FIMI) | 25 |
| Mexico Streaming (AMPROFON) | 10 |
| Netherlands (Dutch Top 40) | 1 |
| Netherlands (Single Top 100) | 3 |
| New Zealand (Recorded Music NZ) | 11 |
| Norway (VG-lista) | 4 |
| Poland (ZPAV) | 9 |
| Portugal (AFP) | 31 |
| Russia Airplay (TopHit) | 5 |
| South Korea (Gaon) | 65 |
| Spain (PROMUSICAE) | 56 |
| Sweden (Sverigetopplistan) | 4 |
| Switzerland (Schweizer Hitparade) | 4 |
| UK Singles (OCC) | 1 |
| US Billboard Hot 100 | 15 |
| US Adult Contemporary (Billboard) | 12 |
| US Adult Top 40 (Billboard) | 8 |
| US Dance/Mix Show Airplay (Billboard) | 4 |
| US Mainstream Top 40 (Billboard) | 11 |

2022 year-end chart performance for "Bad Habits"
| Chart (2022) | Position |
|---|---|
| Australia (ARIA) | 5 |
| Austria (Ö3 Austria Top 40) | 11 |
| Belgium (Ultratop 50 Flanders) | 57 |
| Belgium (Ultratop 50 Wallonia) | 79 |
| Canada (Canadian Hot 100) | 6 |
| CIS Airplay (TopHit) | 9 |
| Denmark (Tracklisten) | 12 |
| Germany (Official German Charts) | 14 |
| Global 200 (Billboard) | 8 |
| Hungary (Dance Top 40) | 10 |
| Hungary (Rádiós Top 40) | 13 |
| Hungary (Single Top 40) | 33 |
| Hungary (Stream Top 40) | 42 |
| Italy (FIMI) | 83 |
| Lithuania (AGATA) | 31 |
| Netherlands (Single Top 100) | 43 |
| New Zealand (Recorded Music NZ) | 9 |
| Poland (ZPAV) | 92 |
| Russia Airplay (TopHit) | 15 |
| South Korea (Circle) | 69 |
| Sweden (Sverigetopplistan) | 23 |
| Switzerland (Schweizer Hitparade) | 11 |
| Ukraine Airplay (TopHit) | 43 |
| UK Singles (OCC) | 2 |
| Ukraine Airplay (TopHit) | 49 |
| US Billboard Hot 100 | 13 |
| US Adult Contemporary (Billboard) | 3 |
| US Adult Top 40 (Billboard) | 5 |
| US Mainstream Top 40 (Billboard) | 30 |

2023 year-end chart performance for "Bad Habits"
| Chart (2023) | Position |
|---|---|
| Australia (ARIA) | 37 |
| Belarus Airplay (TopHit) | 93 |
| CIS Airplay (TopHit) | 54 |
| Denmark (Tracklisten) | 76 |
| Global 200 (Billboard) | 59 |
| Hungary (Dance Top 40) | 54 |
| Hungary (Rádiós Top 40) | 88 |
| Kazakhstan Airplay (TopHit) | 43 |
| Lithuania Airplay (TopHit) | 46 |
| Moldova Airplay (TopHit) | 114 |
| Romania Airplay (TopHit) | 101 |
| Russia Airplay (TopHit) | 115 |
| Ukraine Airplay (TopHit) | 118 |
| UK Singles (OCC) | 30 |
| Ukraine Airplay (TopHit) | 136 |

2024 year-end chart performance for "Bad Habits"
| Chart (2024) | Position |
|---|---|
| Belarus Airplay (TopHit) | 127 |
| CIS Airplay (TopHit) | 88 |
| Kazakhstan Airplay (TopHit) | 87 |

2025 year-end chart performance for "Bad Habits"
| Chart (2025) | Position |
|---|---|
| Argentina Anglo Airplay (Monitor Latino) | 54 |
| Belarus Airplay (TopHit) | 152 |
| CIS Airplay (TopHit) | 150 |
| Estonia Airplay (TopHit) | 166 |
| Lithuania Airplay (TopHit) | 48 |

== Certifications ==
Certifications for "Bad Habits"
| Region | Certification | Certified units/sales |
|---|---|---|
| Australia (ARIA) | 10× Platinum | 700,000^{‡} |
| Austria (IFPI Austria) | 6× Platinum | 180,000^{‡} |
| Brazil (Pro-Música Brasil) | Diamond | 160,000^{‡} |
| Canada (Music Canada) | Diamond | 800,000^{‡} |
| Denmark (IFPI Danmark) | 5× Platinum | 450,000^{‡} |
| France (SNEP) | Diamond | 333,333^{‡} |
| Germany (BVMI) | Diamond | 1,000,000^{‡} |
| Italy (FIMI) | 4× Platinum | 400,000^{‡} |
| New Zealand (RMNZ) | 8× Platinum | 240,000^{‡} |
| Poland (ZPAV) | 4× Platinum | 200,000^{‡} |
| Portugal (AFP) | 4× Platinum | 40,000^{‡} |
| Spain (Promusicae) | 4× Platinum | 240,000^{‡} |
| Switzerland (IFPI Switzerland) | Platinum | 20,000^{‡} |
| United Kingdom (BPI) | 7× Platinum | 4,200,000^{‡} |
| United States (RIAA) | 3× Platinum | 3,000,000^{‡} |
Streaming
| Japan (RIAJ) | Gold | 50,000,000^{†} |
| South Korea (KMCA) | Platinum | 100,000,000^{†} |
^{‡} Sales+streaming figures based on certification alone.^{†} Streaming-only figures based on certification alone.

== Release history ==
Release dates and formats for "Bad Habits"
| Region | Date | Format | Version | Label | Ref. |
|---|---|---|---|---|---|
| Various | 25 June 2021 | CD single | Original | Atlantic UK | |
| Various | 25 June 2021 | Digital download; streaming | Original | Asylum UK | |
| Italy | 25 June 2021 | Contemporary hit radio | Original | Warner Music Italy | |
| United States | 28 June 2021 | Hot adult contemporary radio | Original | Atlantic | |
| Russia | 28 June 2021 | Contemporary hit radio | Original | Sony Music | |
| United States | 29 June 2021 | Contemporary hit radio | Original | Atlantic | |
| Various | 29 June 2021 | Digital download | The Late Late Show with James Corden performance | —N/a | |
| Various | 30 June 2021 | Digital download | Voice note acoustic | —N/a | |
| Various | 9 July 2021 | Digital download; streaming | Acoustic | Asylum UK | |
| Canada | 16 July 2021 | CD single | Original | Warner Music Canada | |
| Canada | 30 July 2021 | Digitally animated CD single | Original | Warner Music Canada | |
| Various | 30 July 2021 | Digital download; streaming | Meduza remix | Asylum UK | |
| Various | 6 August 2021 | Digital download; streaming | Remixes | Asylum UK | |
| Various | 6 August 2021 | Digital download; streaming | Joel Corry remix | Asylum UK | |
| Various | 12 August 2021 | Digital download; streaming | Fumez the Engineer remix featuring Tion Wayne and Central Cee | Asylum UK | |
| Various | 13 August 2021 | Cassette single | Original | Asylum UK | |

== Bring Me the Horizon remix ==
"Bad Habits"

Single by Ed Sheeran featuring Bring Me the Horizon

from the album = (Tour Edition)
- Released: February 17, 2022
- Genre: Pop metal
- Length: 4:10
- Songwriters: Ed Sheeran, Fred Gibson, Johnny McDaid
- Producers: Ed Sheeran, Fred, Johnny McDaid, Jordan Fish, Oliver Sykes

Ed Sheeran singles chronology
| "The Joker and the Queen" (2022) | "Bad Habits" (2022) | "Bam Bam" (2022) |

Bring Me the Horizon singles chronology
| "Die4U" (2021) | "Bad Habits" (2022) | "Maybe" (2022) |

On 14 February 2022, following the performance, a studio version of the track was announced, set for release on 17 February. The remix was included on the tour version of =.

=== Live performance ===
At the 2022 Brit Awards, Sheeran performed "Bad Habits" with Bring Me the Horizon. They'd perform the song together again at Reading Festival later that same year.

=== Commercial performance ===
After its first full tracking week, on Billboard charts dated to 5 March 2022, the remix debuted on three charts, on Hot Alternative Songs at number 17, Hot Rock & Alternative Songs at number 19, becoming Ed Sheeran's first charting song on the chart since Blow, and Hot Hard Rock Songs at number 2, behind "The Rumbling" by SiM, marking Sheeran's first appearance on the chart and Bring Me the Horizon's twelfth.

=== Reception ===
The Editor in Chief of MetalSucks, Emperor Rhombus, called the performance at the BRIT Awards an attempt to combine metal with pop, but said that it came off sounding like an Imagine Dragons song.

=== Track listing ===
- Digital download and streaming
1. "Bad Habits" (featuring Bring Me the Horizon) – 4:10

=== Charts ===
==== Weekly charts ====
Weekly chart performance for "Bad Habits"
| Chart (2022) | Peak position |
|---|---|
| Australia Digital Tracks (ARIA) | 12 |
| New Zealand Hot Singles (RMNZ) | 13 |
| US Hot Rock & Alternative Songs (Billboard) | 19 |

==== Year-end charts ====
Year-end chart performance for "Bad Habits"
| Chart (2022) | Position |
|---|---|
| US Hot Hard Rock Songs (Billboard) | 43 |

== See also ==
- List of highest-certified singles in Australia
- List of Billboard Adult Contemporary number ones of 2021
- List of Billboard number-one dance songs of 2021
