= Afterglow (band) =

American psychedelic rock band

Afterglow was an American psychedelic rock band in the late 1960s.

The band emerged from the Medallions, formed in 1965 in Chico, California, by guitarist Tony Tecumseh (Anthony Vernon Tecumseh, October 27, 1940–January 29, 2012), drummer Larry Alexander and a bassist named Mike, later joined by vocalist Gene Resler. Tecumseh was a Modoc, born in Klamath Agency, Oregon. The group played at local events, before disbanding to attend college. In 1966, Tecumseh, Alexander and Resler reconvened and added bassist Ron George and keyboard player Roger Swanson. After a period of rehearsal they changed their name to Afterglow and began recording an album at Leo Kulka's Golden State Recorders studio in San Francisco. The band performed in Northern California but, because of members' studies, they were unable to complete the album until 1967. Most of the tracks were written by Tecumseh, with Resler taking most of the lead vocals. The self-titled album was released in 1968 on the small New York-based MTA label, but was not successful at the time and the band split up shortly afterwards.

In later years, the album acquired a cult reputation, being described as "a classic example of California pop and psychedelic", and "like a sampler of American psychedelic styles", recalling the music of the Doors, Jefferson Airplane, the Byrds and others. In 1995, it was reissued by Sundazed Music, and members of the band reunited to perform, though without Tecumseh because of his poor health. Tecumseh came to be regarded as "a forerunner in Native American involvement in rock and roll music", and was awarded the Native American Music Association's Lifetime Achievement Award in 2011. He died in 2012.
