= G12 Worship =

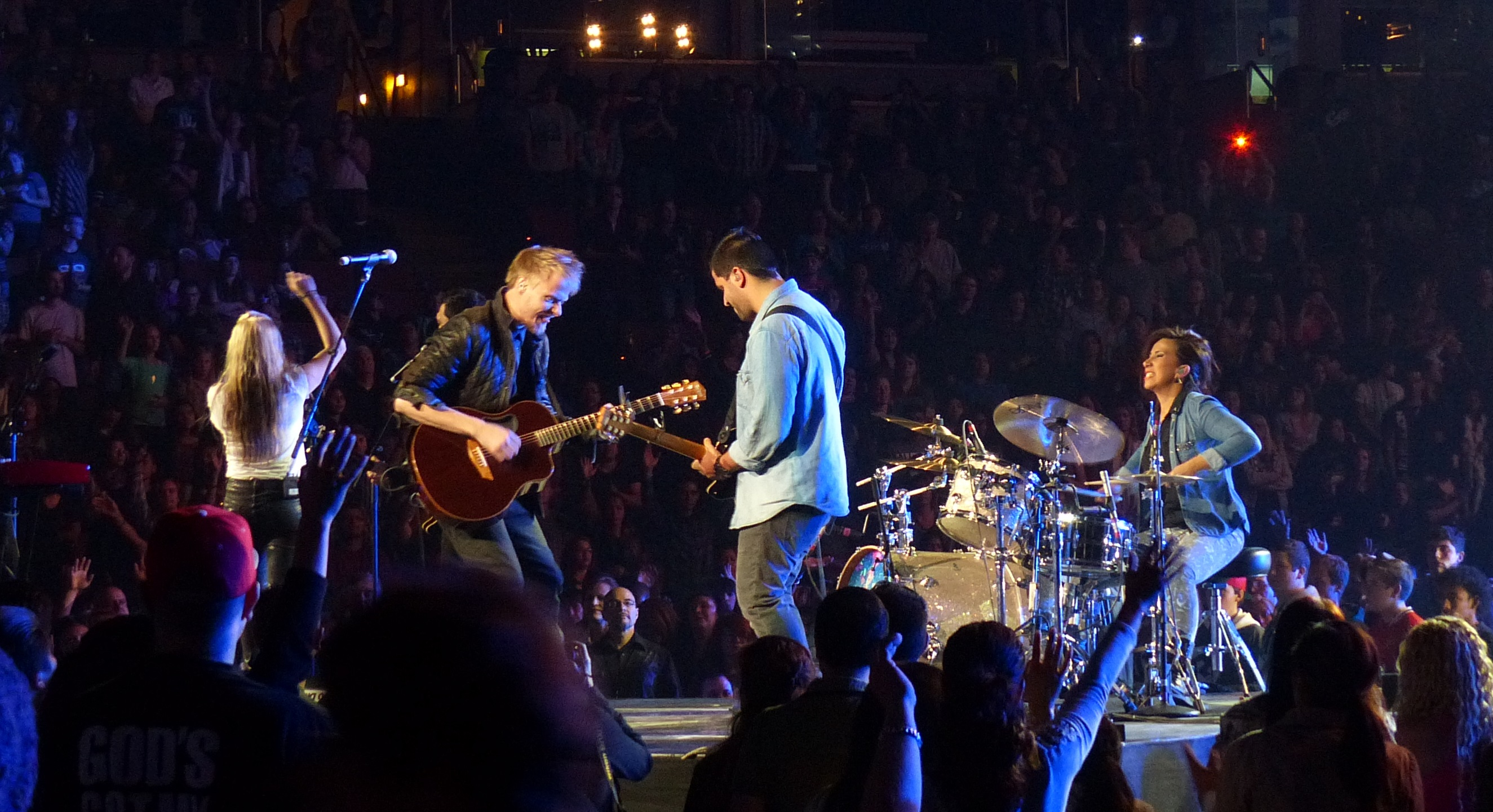
- Soulfire Revolution performing at The Road Show at the Honda Center in 2014

Background information
- Origin: Bogotá, Colombia; Miami, Florida, U.S.
- Genres: CCM, praise & worship
- Years active: 2008–present
- Labels: Sparrow/EMI Christian Music Group
- Members: Lorena Castellanos; Luke Pew; Joey Pew; Luke Page; Anthony Catacoli; Julian Gamba; Paola Sanchez
- Past members: Rich Harding
- Website: g12worship.com

G12 Worship, formerly known as Soulfire Revolution, is a contemporary Christian and contemporary worship band from both Bogotá, Colombia and Miami, Florida, United States. They are signed to the Sparrow Records label, an imprint of EMI Christian Music Group.

== Background ==
Soulfire Revolution is from Bogotá, Colombia and Miami, Florida, United States, and first formed as a band in 2008. They call Mision Carismatica Interncional (MCI) home, which is located in Colombia. They originated in Miami, performing in English, Spanish and Portuguese. The band announced through YouTube a name change on August 2, 2017 to partner more closely with the other ministry band, Generation 12.

== Members ==
- Lorena Castellanos – lead vocals and keyboard
- Richard Harding – co-lead vocals, lead and rhythm-guitar
- Anthony Catacoli – lead guitar
- Julian Gamba – bass guitar
- Paola Sanchez – drums

== Discography ==
=== Studio albums ===
List of studio albums, with selected chart positions
Title	Album details	Peak chart positions	
Title	Album details	US Christ	US Heat
Revival	Released: August 13, 2013; Label: Sparrow; CD, digital download	25	11

== Awards and nominations ==
Aviva won the 2014 Dove Award for 'Spanish Language Album of the Year'.
