= Johnny McDaid =

Irish musician and producer (born 1976)

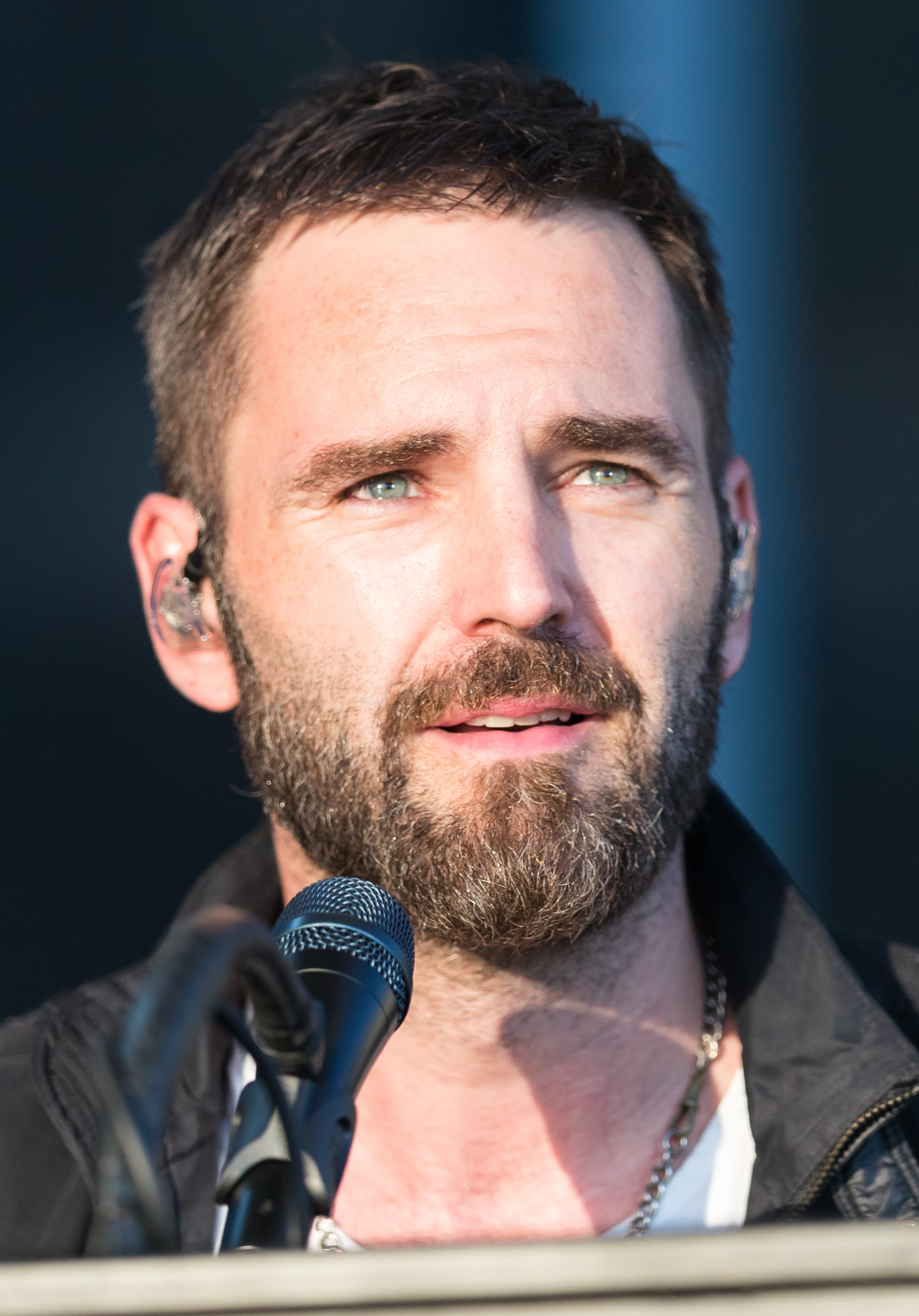
- McDaid in 2018

Background information
- Born: 24 July 1976 (age 50); Dublin, Ireland
- Genres: Britpop; indie rock; alternative rock; pop; dance
- Occupations: Singer-songwriter; musician; record producer
- Instruments: Guitar; piano; vocals; keyboards
- Years active: 1994–present
- Labels: Vandit; Universal
- Member of: Snow Patrol
- Formerly of: Vega4
- Partner: Courteney Cox (2013–2026)

Johnny McDaid (born 24 July 1976) is an Irish singer-songwriter, musician and record producer. He is a member of Snow Patrol and a former member of Vega4. McDaid has written songs with artists including Westlife, Pink and Robbie Williams. He is a frequent collaborator with singer-songwriter Ed Sheeran and co-wrote the pop song "Shape of You".

== Early life ==
Johnny McDaid was born on 24 July 1976 in Dublin, Ireland and raised in Derry, Northern Ireland. He is one of seven children of John and Pauline McDaid, He attended St Brigid's Primary School, Carnhill, and St Columb's College.

== Musical career ==
McDaid was the singer and songwriter of the band Vega4, whose second album You and Others was produced by Jacknife Lee. Its first single, "Life Is Beautiful", was featured on the US Contemporary Radio Charts Top 40 for 12 weeks in 2007. In 2009, McDaid was the first person to sign to Snow Patrol's publishing company, Polar Patrol Publishing.

McDaid went on to play guitar and piano and sing backing vocals in the alternative rock band Snow Patrol. While on tour with Snow Patrol, McDaid was developing his style of writing and working with artists in a variety of genres, scoring a hit with Example's "Say Nothing" which reached number 2 in the UK singles chart in 2012.

In January 2013, McDaid and Gary Lightbody performed at the "Sons & Daughters" concert in Derry, McDaid's hometown, to mark the opening of the city's UK City of Culture year. In early 2013, McDaid moved to Nashville, Tennessee with singer-songwriter Ed Sheeran to work with him on his second album. Sheeran and McDaid are close friends and later moved to Los Angeles together to continue working on Sheeran's second record. Sheeran's X album was released in June 2014 with McDaid having co-written seven of the songs, including "Photograph", which won a BMI Pop Award, and hit song "Bloodstream", which was nominated for Best Song Musically and Lyrically at the 2016 Ivor Novello Awards. The album was nominated for Album of the Year at the 57th Grammy Awards, McDaid's first Grammy nomination. While the album did not win the Grammy, it did go on to with the 2015 BRIT Award for Album of the Year.

While spending much of 2016 working with Ed Sheeran on his third studio album, McDaid also co-wrote "Love My Life" with Robbie Williams and Gary Go from Robbie Williams "The Heavy Entertainment Show" album. The first two singles from Ed Sheeran's ÷ album came out in January 2017 and included McDaid's co-written "Shape of You" which has since become the most streamed song of all time with over 3 billion streams. McDaid produced 3 tracks and co-wrote 8 on the album. "Shape of You" went on to win BMI Pop Song of the Year as well as the Ivor Novello award for Most Performed Work.

In 2017 McDaid co-wrote Faith Hill & Tim McGraw's single "The Rest Of Our Life", Anderson East's single "All On My Mind", and Jamie Lawson's "Can't See Straight". Additionally, McDaid co-wrote Pink's single "What About Us" from her album Beautiful Trauma. The single, co-written with Pink and Steve Mac, and debuted at No1 in 26 Markets globally. DJ Snake released his single "A Different Way" featuring Lauv, which was the third Ed Sheeran, Steve Mac, Johnny McDaid collaboration to be released. In November 2017, McDaid became an Honorary Fellow of The Institute of Irish Studies at the University of Liverpool.

Released in 2018, McDaid co-wrote and produced Keith Urban's single "Parallel Line" and co-wrote Shawn Mendes "Fallin' All In You" from his self-titled and third studio album. In 2018, Snow Patrol released their 7th studio album titled Wildness. The album debuted as #2 on the UK album charts. He also won the IMRO Outstanding Achievement Award with which he was presented in February 2018.

In 2019, McDaid co-wrote "Broken & Beautiful" by Kelly Clarkson, which was featured in the film UglyDolls. McDaid also co-wrote and produced Alicia Keys "Underdog" and "Authors Of Forever" from her seventh studio album 'ALICIA'.

McDaid spent the majority of 2020 and 2021 working with Ed Sheeran on his = album on which he ended up as a producer on 9 songs, a co-writer on 10, including the UK #1 singles "Bad Habits" (nominated for Song of the Year at the 2022 Grammys) and "Shivers".

In 2026, McDaid co-wrote “Animal” by Katseye with Sheeran, Omer Fedi and Blake Slatkin.

== Personal life ==
McDaid began dating actress Courteney Cox in late 2013. The couple announced their engagement on 26 June 2014. In 2019, Cox stated that they had ended their engagement but remained in a relationship. Their separation was confirmed in June 2026.

McDaid has a tattoo on his left arm reading Nuair is gá dom filleadh abhaile, is tú mo réalt eolais ("When I need to get home you're my guiding light"), an Irish translation of the song "Guiding Light" by fellow Northern Irish musician Foy Vance. Ed Sheeran and Vance both have the same tattoo, as does McDaid's younger sister Maev. The song was written for McDaid's father, who died in July 2011. "Guiding Light" was recorded with Sheeran featured on vocals and Vance on vocals and piano.

== Songwriting and production credits ==
Year	Artist	Song	Written with	Produced with	Album
2008	Schiller	"Everything" with Helen Boulding	Christopher von Deylen, Helen Boulding	N/A	Sehnsucht
2009	Paul van Dyk	"Home" feat. Johnny McDaid	Paul van Dyk	Paul van Dyk	Volume
2010	Paul van Dyk	"We Are One" feat. Johnny McDaid	Paul van Dyk	Paul van Dyk	Non-album single
2011	Lena	"I Like You"	Rosi Golan	N/A	Good News
2011	Firefox AK	"Running on My Own"	Andrea Kellerman, Rasmus Kellerman, Harmony Boucher	N/A	Colour the Trees
2012	Paul van Dyk	"Everywhere" feat. Johnny McDaid	Paul van Dyk	N/A	Evolution
2012	Karin Park	"Bending Albert's Law"	Karin Park		Highwire Poetry
2012	Example	"Say Nothing"	Elliot Gleave, Dragan Roganovic	N/A	The Evolution of Man
2012	Lena	"Don't Panic"	Lena Meyer-Landrut, James Flannigan	N/A	Stardust
2013	Bo Bruce	"Speed the Fire"	Catherine B.-Bruce, Thomas Ashby, Gita Langley, James Glannigan	N/A	Before I Sleep
2013	Bo Bruce	"Lightkeeper"	Catherine B.-Bruce	N/A	Before I Sleep
2013	Bo Bruce	"The Fall"	Catherine B.-Bruce, Ingrid Michaelson	N/A	Before I Sleep
2013	Bo Bruce	"How We're Made"	Catherine B.-Bruce		Before I Sleep
2013	Ciaran Gribbin	"My Killer My King"	Ciaran Gribbin		Non-album single
2014	Ed Sheeran	"All of the Stars"	Ed Sheeran		The Fault in Our Stars OST
2014	Ed Sheeran	"Nina"	Ed Sheeran	N/A	X
2014	Ed Sheeran	"Photograph"	Ed Sheeran, Martin Harrington, Thomas Leonard	N/A	X
2014	Ed Sheeran	"Bloodstream" solo or with Rudimental	Ed Sheeran, Gary Lightbody, Amir Izadkhah, Piers Aggett, Kesi Dryden, Leon Rolle	N/A	X
2014	Ed Sheeran	"Tenerife Sea"	Ed Sheeran, Foy Vance	N/A	X
2014	Ed Sheeran	"Afire Love"	Ed Sheeran, Foy Vance		X
2014	Ed Sheeran	"Take It Back"	Ed Sheeran	N/A	X
2014	Ed Sheeran	"English Rose"	Ed Sheeran		X
2015	Kodaline	"Love Will Set You Free"	Stephen Garrigan, Mark Prendergast, Vincent May	N/A	Coming Up for Air
2015	Rudimental	"Never Let You Go" feat. Foy Vance	Amir Izadkhah, Piers Aggett, Kesi Dryden, Leon Rolle, Foy Vance	N/A	We the Generation
2016	Birdy	"Wild Horses"	Jasmine van den Bogaerde	N/A	Beautiful Lies
2016	Biffy Clyro	"Howl"	Simon Neil, Gary Lightbody	N/A	Ellipsis
2016	Robbie Williams	"Love My Life"	Robbie Williams, Gary Go	Gary Go, Jonny Coffer	The Heavy Entertainment Show
2016	Aquilo	"Sorry"	Thomas Higham, Benjamin Fletcher	Aquilo	Silhouettes
2017	Ed Sheeran	"Shape of You"	Ed Sheeran, Steve Mac, Kandi Burruss, Tameka Cottle, Kevin "She'kspere" Briggs	N/A	÷ (Divide)
2017	Rag'n'Bone Man	"The Fire"	Rory Graham, Jonny Coffer, Mark Crew, Daniel Priddy	Jonny Coffer	Human
2017	Ed Sheeran	"Eraser"	Ed Sheeran		÷ (Divide)
2017	Ed Sheeran	"Galway Girl"	Ed Sheeran, Amy Wadge, Foy Vance, Damian McKee, Eamon Murray, Liam Bradley, Niamh Dunne, Sean Og Graham	N/A	÷ (Divide)
2017	Ed Sheeran	"Hearts Don't Break Around Here"	Ed Sheeran	N/A	÷ (Divide)
2017	Ed Sheeran	"What Do I Know?"	Ed Sheeran, Foy Vance	Ed Sheeran	÷ (Divide)
2017	Ed Sheeran	"Supermarket Flowers"	Ed Sheeran, Benny Blanco	Benny Blanco	÷ (Divide)
2017	Ed Sheeran	"Barcelona"	Ed Sheeran, Amy Wadge, Foy Vance, Benny Blanco	N/A	÷ (Divide)
2017	Ed Sheeran	"Nancy Mulligan"	Ed Sheeran, Murray Cummings, Amy Wadge, Foy Vance, Benny Blanco	N/A	÷ (Divide)
2017	Zara Larsson	"Don't Let Me Be Yours"	Zara Larsson, Ed Sheeran, Steve Mac	N/A	So Good
2017	James Blunt	"Make Me Better"	James Blunt, Ed Sheeran	N/A	The Afterlove
2017	Pink	"What About Us"	Alecia Moore, Steve Mac	N/A	Beautiful Trauma
2017	Anderson East	"All on My Mind"	Anderson East, Aaron Raitiere, Ed Sheeran	N/A	Encore
2017	DJ Snake	"A Different Way" feat. Lauv	William Grigahcine, Ilsey Juber, Lindy Robbins, Ed Sheeran, Ryan Tedder, Steve Mac	N/A	Non-album single
2017	Jamie Lawson	"Can't See Straight"	Jamie Lawson, Ed Sheeran	N/A	Happy Accidents
2017	Jamie Lawson	"The Last Spark"	Jamie Lawson, Gary Go	N/A	Happy Accidents
2017	Tim McGraw	"The Rest of Our Life" with Faith Hill	Ed Sheeran, Amy Wadge, Steve Mac	N/A	The Rest of Our Life
2017	Weezer	"Get Right"	Rivers Cuomo, Josh Alexander, Jonny Coffer	N/A	Pacific Daydream
2017	Robbie Williams	"Speaking Tongues"	Robbie Williams, Ellis Taylor	Show N Prove	Under the Radar Volume 2
2018	Keith Urban	"Parallel Line"	Ed Sheeran, Amy Wadge, Julia Michaels, Benny Blanco, Christopher Martin, Jonny Buckland, Guy Berryman, William Champion, Mikkel Eriksen, Tor Hermansen	Keith Urban, Ed Sheeran, Benny Blanco	Graffiti U
2018	Kodaline	"Follow Your Fire"	Stephen Garrigan, Steve Mac	N/A	Politics of Living
2018	The Shires	"Stay the Night"	John Newman, James Newman, Ed Sheeran	N/A	Accidentally on Purpose
2018	Shawn Mendes	"Fallin' All in You"	Shawn Mendes, Scott Friedman, Teddy Geiger, Ed Sheeran, Fred Again	N/A	Shawn Mendes
2018	Gareth Emery	"Call to Arms" feat. Evan Henzi	Gareth Emery, Gary Lightbody, Evan Henzi	N/A	Non-album single
2018	Kodaline	"Head Held High"	Stephen Garrigan, Liam O'Donnell, Jonny Coffer	N/A	Politics of Living
2018	Paul van Dyk	"Music Rescues Me" feat. Plumb	Paul van Dyk	N/A	Music Rescues Me
2018	Kodaline	"Hide and Seek"	Stephen Garrigan, Corey Sanders, William Reynolds	Will Reynolds, Max Marlow, Graham Archer	Politics of Living
2018	Kodaline	"Born Again"	Stephen Garrigan, Wayne Hector, Steve Mac	N/A	Politics of Living
2018	Kodaline	"Hell Froze Over"	Stephen Garrigan, Max Marlow	Will Reynolds, Max Marlow, Graham Archer	Politics of Living
2018	Paul van Dyk	"Reprise"	Paul van Dyk	N/A	Music Rescues Me
2019	Beoga	"Matthew's Daughter"	Damian McKee, Eamon Murray, Liam Bradley, Niamh Dunne, Sean Og Graham, Ed Sheeran	N/A	Carousel
2019	Kelly Clarkson	"Broken & Beautiful"	Alecia Moore, Steve Mac, Christopher Comstock	N/A	UglyDolls OST
2019	John Newman	"Forever's Not Long Enough"	John Newman, Foy Vance, Jonny Coffer	N/A	Out of the Blue EP
2019	Illenium	"Blood" with Foy Vance	Nicholas Miller, Damian McKee, Eamon Murray, Liam Bradley, Niamh Dunne, Sean Og Graham, Amy Wadge, Foy Vance, Jonny Coffer	N/A	Ascend
2019	John Newman	"Mama"	John Newman, James Newman, Foy Vance, Jonny Coffer	N/A	Out of the Blue EP
2020	Alicia Keys	"Underdog"	Alicia Keys, Ed Sheeran, Amy Wadge, Foy Vance, Jonny Coffer	Alicia Keys	Alicia
2020	Beoga	"Aurora II"	Damian McKee, Eamon Murray, Liam Bradley, Niamh Dunne, Sean Og Graham, Jonny Coffer	N/A	Carousel
2020	Example	"Erin"	N/A	Example	Some Nights Last for Days
2020	Alicia Keys	"Authors of Forever"	Alicia Keys, Jonny Coffer	Alicia Keys, Jonny Coffer, Mark Ronson	Alicia
2021	Ross Copperman	"Electricity"	Ross Copperman, Ed Sheeran	N/A	Somewhere There's a Light On EP
2021	Ross Copperman	"Therapy"	Ross Copperman, Ed Sheeran	N/A	Somewhere There's a Light On EP
2021	Ed Sheeran	"Bad Habits"	Ed Sheeran, Fred Again	Ed Sheeran, Fred Again, Parisi	= (Equals)
2021	BTS	"Permission to Dance"	Jenna Andrews, Stephen Kirk, Ed Sheeran, Steve Mac	N/A	Non-album single
2021	Ed Sheeran	"Visiting Hours"	Ed Sheeran, Amy Wadge, Michael Pollack, Anthony Clemons Jr., Kim Lang Smith, Scott Carter	Ed Sheeran, Parisi	= (Equals)
2021	Maisie Peters	"Hollow"	Maisie Peters, Ed Sheeran, Joseph Rubel	N/A	You Signed Up for This
2021	Ed Sheeran	"Shivers"	Ed Sheeran, Kai Lavelle, Steve Mac	N/A	= (Equals)
2021	Ed Sheeran	"Tides"	Ed Sheeran, Foy Vance	Ed Sheeran, Foy Vance, Joe Rubel	= (Equals)
2021	Ed Sheeran	"Overpass Graffiti"	Ed Sheeran, Fred Again	Ed Sheeran, Fred Again	= (Equals)
2021	Ed Sheeran	"The Joker and the Queen"	Ed Sheeran, Fred Again, Samuel Romans	Ed Sheeran, Fred Again, Romans	= (Equals)
2021	Ed Sheeran	"Collide"	Ed Sheeran, Ben Kweller, Fred Again	Ed Sheeran, Fred Again, Benji Gibson	= (Equals)
2021	Ed Sheeran	"Love in Slow Motion"	Ed Sheeran, Natalie Hemby	Ed Sheeran, Fred Again, Joe Rubel	= (Equals)
2021	Ed Sheeran	"Sandman"	Ed Sheeran	Ed Sheeran	= (Equals)
2021	Ed Sheeran	"Be Right Now"	Ed Sheeran, Fred Again	Ed Sheeran, Fred Again, Parisi	= (Equals)
2022	Ed Sheeran	"Penguins"	Ed Sheeran	Ed Sheeran	= (Tour Edition)
2022	Ed Sheeran	"One Life"	Steve Mac, Ed Sheeran	N/A	= (Tour Edition)
2022	Ed Sheeran	"Celestial"	Steve Mac, Ed Sheeran	N/A	Single
2024	Ed Sheeran	"Under the Tree"	Ed Sheeran	Ed Sheeran	Non-album single
2025	Westlife	"Chariot"	Ed Sheeran, Steve Mac, Will Reynolds		25: The Ultimate Collection
2026	Katseye	“Animal”	Ed Sheeran, Omer Fedi, Blake Slatkin	N/A	Wild

== Sources ==
- Guildhall Press (September 2008). City of Music. Guildhall Press. p. 295. ISBN 978-1-906271-18-3.
- Mpfrees (27 March 2007). "Vega4, "Life Is Beautiful"". New York Post.
- Internet DJ. "Paul Van Dyk's Historic Grammy Nomination".
