= Afterglow: A Last Conversation with Pauline Kael =

2003 film critique book

- Editor: Francis Davis
- Author: Pauline Kael
- Language: English
- Publication date: 2003

Afterglow: A Last Conversation with Pauline Kael (2003) is among the last publicly available materials to gather film critic Pauline Kael's thoughts on the movie medium, prior to her death on September 3, 2001. The book was prepared by jazz critic Francis Davis.

== Background ==
In the book, she describes her affinity for the new works of directors such as Quentin Tarantino, Paul Thomas Anderson and David O. Russell, showing an appreciation for Pulp Fiction, Jackie Brown, the first half of Boogie Nights, Magnolia, and Three Kings. She also favorably considers the television shows Sex and the City and the first season of The Sopranos. She laments what she considers to be the declining quality of Steven Spielberg's and Martin Scorsese's recent work.
