= Visiting Hours (song) =

2021 promotional single by Ed Sheeran

Promotional single by Ed Sheeran

from the album =
- Released: 19 August 2021
- Studio: The Tree House, Decoy Studios (Suffolk, UK); Fieldwork Studios (London/Suffolk, UK); Infinite Disco (Melbourne, AU)
- Genre: Folk-pop
- Length: 3:35
- Label: Asylum; Atlantic
- Songwriters: Amy Wadge; Ant Clemons; Ed Sheeran; Johnny McDaid; Kim Lang Smith; Michael Pollack; Scott Carter
- Producers: Ed Sheeran; Johnny McDaid

Music Video
- "Visiting Hours" on YouTube

"Visiting Hours" is a song by English singer-songwriter Ed Sheeran. It was released on 19 August 2021 as the promotional single from his fifth studio album, = ("Equals"), the same day he announced the album. The song was produced by Sheeran and Johnny McDaid.

== Background and release ==
On 2 March 2021, Australian music promoter Michael Gudinski died at the age of 68. Sheeran first performed "Visiting Hours" at Gudinski's funeral on 24 March 2021 as a tribute to him in Australia, delivering an emotional performance. Gudinski's close friends and fellow musicians, Kylie Minogue and Jimmy Barnes, as well as comedian Jimmy Carr, provide backing vocals on the song. He finished the song during his two weeks of mandatory quarantine because of COVID-19 rules due to his decision to travel to Australia. On 19 August 2021, Sheeran released the song as a promotional single and announced the album. A live performance video, which was filmed in St. Stephen's Church in Hampstead, London, was also released with the song. Sheeran stated that he "finished writing this song going through proper grief for the first time, and for me its one of the most important songs on =".

== Lyrics ==
Lyrically, "Visiting Hours" is an ode to the late Michael Gudinski, an Australian music promoter. In the first verse, Sheeran makes a reference to his daughter, Lyra Seaborn Sheeran, wishing that Gudinski had got to meet her: "I wish that Heaven had visiting hours / So I could just show up and bring the news / That she's getting older and I wish that you'd met her / The things that she'll learn from me, I got them all from you".

== Credits and personnel ==
Credits adapted from Tidal.

- Ed Sheeran – vocals, songwriting, production
- Johnny McDaid – production, songwriting, engineering, backing vocals
- Parisi – additional production
- Josh McDaid – backing vocals
- Courteney Cox – backing vocals
- Aine McDaid – backing vocals
- Pauline McDaid – backing vocals
- Maev McDaid – backing vocals
- Kylie Minogue – backing vocals
- Jimmy Barnes – backing vocals
- Jimmy Carr – backing vocals
- Ant Clemons – songwriting
- Michael Pollack – songwriting
- Amy Wadge – songwriting
- Scott Carter – songwriting
- Kim Lang Smith – songwriting
- Graham Archer – engineering
- Will Reynolds – engineering assistant
- Spike Stent – mixing
- Charlie Holmes – mixing assistant
- Kieran Beardmore – mixing assistant
- Matt Wolach – mixing assistant
- Stuart Hawkes – mastering

== Charts ==
Chart performance for "Visiting Hours"
Chart (2021)	Peak position
Australia (ARIA)	3
Austria (Ö3 Austria Top 40)	28
Canada Hot 100 (Billboard)	31
Canada AC (Billboard)	40
Czech Republic Singles Digital (ČNS IFPI)	51
Denmark (Tracklisten)	16
Euro Digital Song Sales (Billboard)	2
France (SNEP)	169
Germany (GfK)	46
Global 200 (Billboard)	21
Ireland (IRMA)	8
Italy (FIMI)	68
Lithuania (AGATA)	44
Netherlands (Single Top 100)	52
New Zealand (Recorded Music NZ)	11
Norway (VG-lista)	9
Portugal (AFP)	86
Singapore (RIAS)	24
Slovakia (Singles Digitál Top 100)	33
South Africa (TOSAC)	26
South Korea (Gaon)	183
Sweden (Sverigetopplistan)	16
Switzerland (Schweizer Hitparade)	8
UK Singles (OCC)	5
US Billboard Hot 100	75

== Certifications ==
Certifications for "Visiting Hours"
Region	Certification	Certified units/sales
Australia (ARIA)	Gold	35,000^{‡}
Austria (IFPI Austria)	Gold	15,000^{‡}
Canada (Music Canada)	Platinum	80,000^{‡}
Denmark (IFPI Danmark)	Gold	45,000^{‡}
Italy (FIMI)	Gold	50,000^{‡}
New Zealand (RMNZ)	Platinum	30,000^{‡}
United Kingdom (BPI)	Platinum	600,000^{‡}
^{‡} Sales+streaming figures based on certification alone.
