= Overpass Graffiti =

Single by Ed Sheeran

from the album =
- Released: 29 October 2021
- Genre: Synth-pop; new wave
- Length: 3:56
- Label: Asylum; Atlantic
- Songwriters: Ed Sheeran; Johnny McDaid; Fred Gibson
- Producers: Sheeran; McDaid; Fred Again

Ed Sheeran singles chronology
"Shivers" (2021)	"Overpass Graffiti" (2021)	"Merry Christmas" (2021)

Music video
- "Overpass Graffiti" on YouTube

Audio sample
- "Overpass Graffiti": file; help

"Overpass Graffiti" is a song by English singer-songwriter Ed Sheeran, released through Asylum and Atlantic Records on 29 October 2021, as the third single from his fifth studio album, = (2021). It was written and produced by Sheeran, Johnny McDaid and Fred.

== Promotion and release ==
On 19 August 2021, Sheeran announced his fifth studio album, =, in which the song is listed on the tracklist. He later performed the song for NPR's Tiny Desk Concert series on 26 October 2021. On 29 October 2021, "Overpass Graffiti" was released alongside the album as the third single.

== Composition ==
"Overpass Graffiti" is in its fast tempo which is written in the key of C major and it is composed in common time (4/4 time).

== Lyric video ==
A lyric video for the song was uploaded to YouTube on 29 October 2021 along with the other lyric videos of the songs that appeared on the tracklisting of =.

== Music video ==
The music video of the song was released on 29 October 2021 on Sheeran's YouTube account the same day as its parent album's release, which was directed by Jason Koenig who previously directed the official music videos for "Shape of You", "Galway Girl", "Perfect", "South of the Border" and "Put It All on Me".

In the music video, Sheeran, playing himself, is accidentally left behind by his tour bus during a late-night stop in an unspecified area of the Southwestern United States. He ends up going on wild adventures and meeting different people along the way. This ranges from going camping with a group of teens, going wild in a glow-in-the-dark party, riding with a biker gang, and riding in an old station wagon with a family as they chase down his tour bus.

The music video features retired professional sumo wrestler Yamamotoyama Ryūta (credited as "Yama"), who appears towards the end of the clip inviting Sheeran for a ride on the bus. The video also features a cameo from Emilio Rivera. Finally, the snippet of the Japanese cover of Sheeran's smash-hit "Shape of You" by Japanese singer MARINA plays during the end credits, as the bus (now with Sheeran on it) drives away. In a very brief scene in the glow-in-the-dark party, the female boxer, Jennie Pegouskie, from the "Shape of You" music video (in which Yamamotoyama also starred), appears in a boxing stance with Sheeran.

The music video's credits reveal it was filmed at two movie ranches in unincorporated areas just east of the city of Santa Clarita, California: Middleton Ranch (in Soledad Canyon), and Golden Oak Ranch.

== Critical reception ==
Stereogum described the song as "new wave-esque". In an album review, The New York Times said of the song, "At least the best song on the album is also the one that seems destined to be his next you'll-hear-it-till-you're-sick-of-it smash: "Overpass Graffiti", a moody, synth-streaked '80s throwback that sounds like a more melancholy update of Rod Stewart's "Young Turks." In an article about the song, Genius described it as "an '80s synth-pop-inspired song about struggling to let go after a breakup."

== Track listing ==
- Digital download, streaming and CD single
1. "Overpass Graffiti" – 3:56
- Digital download and streaming
1. "Overpass Graffiti" (Alle Farben Remix) – 3:23
- Digital download and streaming
1. "Overpass Graffiti" (TCTS Remix) – 4:36

== Credits and personnel ==
- Ed Sheeran – vocals, backing vocals, acoustic guitar, songwriting, production, writing
- Johnny McDaid – backing vocals, bass, electric guitar, keyboards, programming, production, engineering, songwriting
- Fred – bass, drums, keyboards, programming, backing vocals, acoustic guitar, production, engineering, songwriting
- Louise Clare Marshall – additional vocals
- Stuart Hawkes – mastering
- Mark "Spike" Stent – mixing
- Graham Archer – engineering, vocal production
- Kieran Beardmore – mixing assistance
- Charlie Holmes – mixing assistance
- Will Reynolds – engineering assistance
- Hal Ritson – additional engineering

== Charts ==
=== Weekly charts ===
Weekly chart performance for "Overpass Graffiti"
Chart (2021–2024)	Peak position
Argentina Hot 100 (Billboard)	91
Australia (ARIA)	8
Austria (Ö3 Austria Top 40)	20
Belgium (Ultratop 50 Flanders)	11
Belgium (Ultratop 50 Wallonia)	11
Canada Hot 100 (Billboard)	23
Canada AC (Billboard)	17
Canada Hot AC (Billboard)	28
CIS Airplay (TopHit)	56
Croatia (HRT)	7
Czech Republic Airplay (ČNS IFPI)	1
Czech Republic Singles Digital (ČNS IFPI)	20
Denmark (Tracklisten)	16
Estonia Airplay (TopHit)	197
Euro Digital Song Sales (Billboard)	7
Finland (Suomen virallinen lista)	12
France (SNEP)	64
Germany (GfK)	17
Global 200 (Billboard)	11
Hungary (Rádiós Top 40)	31
Hungary (Single Top 40)	15
Iceland (Tónlistinn)	23
Ireland (IRMA)	4
Italy (FIMI)	66
Japan (Japan Hot 100)	99
Lebanon (Lebanese Top 20)	19
Lithuania (AGATA)	24
Lithuania Airplay (TopHit)	111
Netherlands (Dutch Top 40)	6
Netherlands (Single Top 100)	27
New Zealand (Recorded Music NZ)	10
Norway (VG-lista)	21
Poland Airplay (ZPAV)	5
Portugal (AFP)	44
Russia Airplay (TopHit)	198
San Marino (SMRRTV Top 50)	2
Singapore (RIAS)	17
Slovakia Airplay (ČNS IFPI)	1
Slovakia Singles Digital (ČNS IFPI)	19
South Africa (TOSAC)	26
Spain (PROMUSICAE)	81
Sweden (Sverigetopplistan)	19
Switzerland (Schweizer Hitparade)	13
UK Singles (Official Charts)	4
US Billboard Hot 100	41

=== Monthly charts ===
Monthly chart performance for "Whatever"
Chart (2024)	Peak position
CIS Airplay (TopHit)	65

=== Year-end charts ===
Year-end chart performance for "Overpass Graffiti"
Chart (2022)	Position
Belgium (Ultratop 50 Flanders)	38
Belgium (Ultratop 50 Wallonia)	77
CIS Airplay (TopHit)	169
Global Excl. US (Billboard)	141
Netherlands (Dutch Top 40)	19
Poland (ZPAV)	79
UK Singles (OCC)	51

2024 year-end chart performance for "Overpass Graffiti"
Chart (2024)	Position
Lithuania Airplay (TopHit)	90

2025 year-end chart performance for "Overpass Graffiti"
Chart (2025)	Position
Lithuania Airplay (TopHit)	149

== Certifications ==
Certifications for "Overpass Graffiti"
Region	Certification	Certified units/sales
Austria (IFPI Austria)	Platinum	30,000^{‡}
Canada (Music Canada)	Platinum	80,000^{‡}
Denmark (IFPI Danmark)	Gold	45,000^{‡}
Germany (BVMI)	Gold	200,000^{‡}
Italy (FIMI)	Gold	50,000^{‡}
New Zealand (RMNZ)	Platinum	30,000^{‡}
Poland (ZPAV)	Platinum	50,000^{‡}
United Kingdom (BPI)	Platinum	600,000^{‡}
^{‡} Sales+streaming figures based on certification alone.

== Release history ==
Release dates and formats for "Overpass Graffiti"
Region	Date	Format(s)	Version	Label	Ref.
Various	29 October 2021	Digital download; streaming; CD single	Original	Atlantic	
Various	29 October 2021	Digital download; streaming	Alle Farben Remix	Atlantic	
Italy	12 November 2021	Contemporary hit radio	Original	Warner	
Various	19 November 2021	Digital download; streaming	TCTS Remix	Atlantic	
