= Kal Lavelle =

Irish singer-songwriter based in London

Kal Lavelle is an Irish singer-songwriter based in London.

Lavelle's first EP; Shivers was self-released in June 2011, and reached No. 5 in the iTunes Singer/Songwriter chart. Following the release of her EP, Lavelle went on tour with Ed Sheeran. Her song "Breakfast at Tiffany's" was chosen as 'Single of the Week' on UK iTunes, and was subsequently downloaded over 60,000 times.

Lavelle's album For the Loved and Lost was released on 1 June 2018.
