= Leon Bosch =

- Born: 7 July 1961 (age 64); Cape Town, South Africa
- Instrument: double bass
- Label: Meridian Records
- Website: www.leonbosch.co.uk/

Leon Bosch is a double bassist known for his expressive bel canto style. He was principal double bass of the Academy of St Martin in the Fields, from 1995 until 2014 but is also known as a chamber musician, recitalist, concerto soloist, teacher, conductor and program consultant. He is artistic director of the chamber music ensembles I Musicanti and the Ubuntu Ensemble.

== Career ==
Born in Cape Town, though now a British citizen, Bosch graduated from the University of Cape Town before continuing his studies at the Royal Northern College of Music in Manchester. Since his 1984 London solo debut with the Philharmonia Orchestra, Bosch has appeared as a concerto soloist with many distinguished musicians, including Pinchas Zukerman, Sir Charles Groves and Nicholas Kraemer.

Highlights of his chamber music partnerships have included engagements with the Lindsay, Belcea and Brodsky String Quartets, the Academy of St Martin in the Fields Chamber Ensemble, I Musicanti, and the Moscow Virtuosi. He has worked with such pianists as Maria João Pires, Mikhail Rudy, Vladimir Ovchinikov, Peter Donohoe, Martin Roscoe and, most recently on CD, the Vienna-based Korean pianist Sung-Suk Kang.

Bosch has played a significant part in, and received acclaim for, the exploration of challenging and little-known music for double bass both in live performance and on disc. He has been responsible for a number of important first performances including "Pueblo", a commission from John McCabe, several works by Allan Stephenson, and music by the South African composers Hendrik Hofmeyr and Paul Hanmer.

As a teacher, Leon Bosch holds a professorship at Trinity Laban Conservatoire of Music and Dance in London and is on the teaching staff at The Purcell School for young musicians

In 2024, he received the Walter Willson Cobbett medal, awarded by the Worshipful Company of Musicians for services to chamber music

Bosch's experiences under South Africa's apartheid regime have ensured he has a keen interest in social and political issues; he holds a master's degree in Intelligence and International Relations from the University of Salford.

== Discography ==
With Sung-Suk Kang (piano)

The Music of Rankl, Sprongl and Hindemith

Josep Cervera-Bret: The Catalan Virtuoso

Pedro Valls: Music for Double Bass and Piano

The Hungarian Double Bass

Bottesini: Virtuoso Double Bass, vols 1 & 2

The Russian Double Bass

The British Double Bass

With Rebeca Omordia (piano)

The South African Double Bass

18 Negro Spirituals

Bottesini: Virtuoso Double Bass vol 3

With I Musicanti

Giovanni Bottesini: Gran Quintetto in C minor

With the Academy of St Martin in the Fields

Carl Ditters von Dittersdorf: Complete Works for Solo Double Bass

With the Lviv National Philharmonic Orchestra of Ukraine

Thomas de Hartmann: Fantaisie-Concerto op 65
