= Afterglow (Ed Sheeran song) =

2020 single by Ed Sheeran

Single by Ed Sheeran
- Written: 2019
- Released: 21 December 2020
- Genre: Folk-pop
- Length: 3:05
- Label: Asylum; Atlantic
- Songwriters: Ed Sheeran; David Hodges; Fred Gibson
- Producers: Fred; Ed Sheeran; Parisi

Ed Sheeran singles chronology
"Own It" (2019)	"Afterglow" (2020)	"Bad Habits" (2021)

Music video
- "Afterglow" on YouTube

"Afterglow" is a song by English singer Ed Sheeran. Released on 21 December 2020, the song marked Sheeran's first single release in more than 18 months. An accompanying music video features a one-take performance by Sheeran with solo acoustic guitar accompaniment.

The song reached number-one in Israel and peaked within the top-ten of the charts in ten other countries, including the United Kingdom (number two on the UK Singles Chart), Australia and Switzerland. It also became Sheeran's 13th top ten on the US Billboard Adult Top 40, the most on the chart for a male solo artist.

== Background ==
On 20 December 2020, after having taken an extended hiatus from public life, Sheeran returned to social media to announce his new single: "Hey guys. 'Afterglow' is a song I wrote last year that I wanted to release for you". He further explained that the song is "not the first single from the next album" but just a song he loves.

== Cover art ==
The cover art depicts an original piece of action painting created by Sheeran himself.

== Critical reception ==
The song received generally positive reviews from critics. Billboard's Gil Kaufmann described the song as a "spare acoustic ballad" that features a "haunting chorus". Zoe Haylock of Vulture compared the song to Taylor Swift's latest surprise releases, saying he "took a page out of Taylor Swift's book and surprised fans with a new single" and went on to describe the track as one of his "acoustic bangers". Morgan Hines of USA Today thought the song, accompanied by a "mellow melody", "exudes a feeling of intimacy during an emotional time between loved ones".

== Personnel ==
Credits adapted from Tidal.

- Ed Sheeran – producer, guitar, vocals, backing vocals
- Fred – producer, bass, programmer
- Marco Parisi – synthesiser
- Giampaolo Jack Parisi – vocoder
- Stuart Hawkes – masterer
- Mark Spike Stent – mixer
- Matt Wolach – assistant mixer
- Parisi – producer, sound designer

== Charts ==
=== Weekly charts ===
Chart performance for "Afterglow"
Chart (2020–2021)	Peak position
Australia (ARIA)	7
Austria (Ö3 Austria Top 40)	5
Belgium (Ultratop 50 Flanders)	5
Belgium (Ultratop 50 Wallonia)	8
Canada Hot 100 (Billboard)	10
Canada AC (Billboard)	1
Canada CHR/Top 40 (Billboard)	16
Canada Hot AC (Billboard)	7
CIS Airplay (TopHit)	27
Croatia (HRT)	1
Czech Republic Airplay (ČNS IFPI)	5
Czech Republic Singles Digital (ČNS IFPI)	15
Denmark (Tracklisten)	27
Dominican Republic (SODINPRO)	42
Euro Digital Song Sales (Billboard)	1
Finland (Suomen virallinen lista)	19
France (SNEP)	129
Germany (GfK)	10
Global 200 (Billboard)	13
Greece (IFPI)	49
Hungary (Rádiós Top 40)	35
Hungary (Single Top 40)	39
Hungary (Stream Top 40)	29
Iceland (Tónlistinn)	3
Ireland (IRMA)	2
Israel (Media Forest)	1
Italy (FIMI)	16
Lebanon (Lebanese Top 20)	3
Lithuania (AGATA)	18
Malaysia (RIM)	14
Mexico (Billboard Mexican Airplay)	22
Netherlands (Dutch Top 40)	10
Netherlands (Single Top 100)	15
New Zealand (Recorded Music NZ)	12
Norway (VG-lista)	9
Poland Airplay (ZPAV)	44
Portugal (AFP)	59
Romania (Airplay 100)	66
Russia Airplay (TopHit)	29
San Marino (SMRRTV Top 50)	15
Singapore (RIAS)	8
Slovakia Airplay (ČNS IFPI)	1
Slovakia Singles Digital (ČNS IFPI)	19
Slovenia (SloTop50)	6
Spain (Promusicae)	77
Sweden (Sverigetopplistan)	13
Switzerland (Schweizer Hitparade)	2
UK Singles (Official Charts)	2
US Billboard Hot 100	29
US Adult Contemporary (Billboard)	11
US Adult Pop Airplay (Billboard)	7
US Adult Alternative Airplay (Billboard)	38
US Pop Airplay (Billboard)	16

=== Year-end charts ===
Year-end chart performance for "Afterglow"
Chart (2021)	Position
Australia (ARIA)	63
Austria (Ö3 Austria Top 40)	38
Belgium (Ultratop Flanders)	46
Belgium (Ultratop Wallonia)	76
Canada (Canadian Hot 100)	39
Denmark (Tracklisten)	80
Germany (Official German Charts)	51
Global 200 (Billboard)	152
Ireland (IRMA)	48
Italy (FIMI)	99
Netherlands (Dutch Top 40)	41
Netherlands (Single Top 100)	91
Sweden (Sverigetopplistan)	98
Switzerland (Schweizer Hitparade)	28
UK Singles (OCC)	66
US Adult Contemporary (Billboard)	26
US Adult Top 40 (Billboard)	38

== Certifications ==
Certifications for "Afterglow"
Region	Certification	Certified units/sales
Australia (ARIA)	Platinum	70,000^{‡}
Austria (IFPI Austria)	2× Platinum	60,000^{‡}
Belgium (BRMA)	Gold	20,000^{‡}
Canada (Music Canada)	2× Platinum	160,000^{‡}
Denmark (IFPI Danmark)	Platinum	90,000^{‡}
France (SNEP)	Gold	100,000^{‡}
Germany (BVMI)	Gold	200,000^{‡}
Italy (FIMI)	Platinum	70,000^{‡}
New Zealand (RMNZ)	2× Platinum	60,000^{‡}
Poland (ZPAV)	Gold	25,000^{‡}
Portugal (AFP)	Gold	5,000^{‡}
Spain (Promusicae)	Gold	30,000^{‡}
United Kingdom (BPI)	Platinum	600,000^{‡}
^{‡} Sales+streaming figures based on certification alone.

== Release history ==
Release dates and formats for "Afterglow"
Region	Date	Format	Label	Ref.
Various	21 December 2020	Digital download; streaming	Asylum; Atlantic	
