= Paul van Dyk discography =

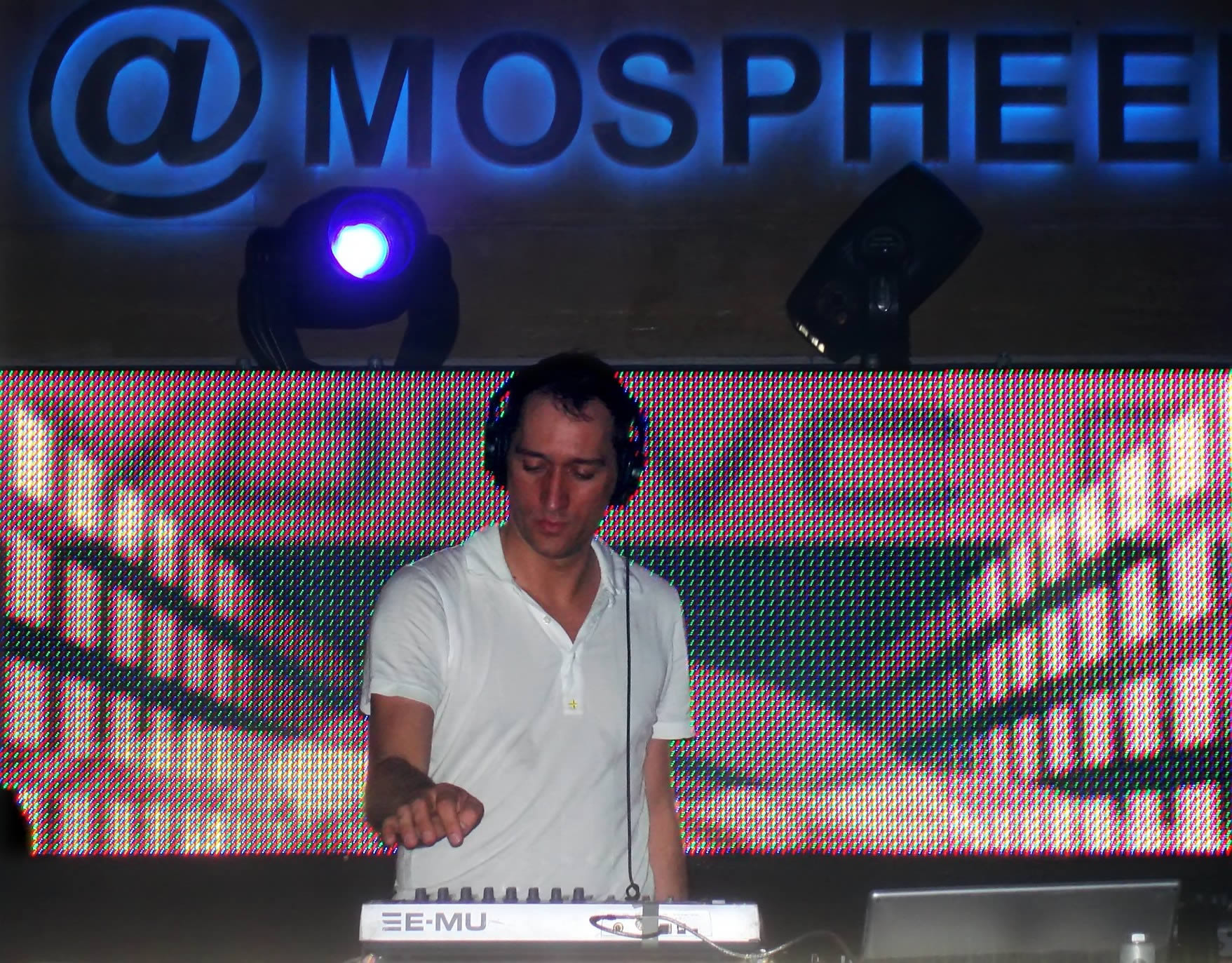
- Studio albums: 11
- Extended plays: 2
- Compilation albums: 7
- Video albums: 1

Paul van Dyk is a German DJ and record producer.

== Albums ==
=== Studio albums ===
Title	Album details	Peak chart positions						
Title	Album details	GER	AUS	FIN	NL	SWI	UK	US Elec
45 RPM	Released: 5 December 1994; Label: MFS; Format: CD, vinyl	—	—	—	—	—	—	—
Seven Ways	Released: 25 November 1996; Label: MFS; Format: CD, vinyl, cassette	81	—	—	—	—	117	—
Out There and Back	Released: 5 June 2000; Label: Mute, Vandit; Format: CD, vinyl	19	41	34	—	—	12	—
Reflections	Released: 7 October 2003; Label: Mute, Vandit; Format: CD, vinyl, digital download	8	153	—	60	—	81	3
In Between	Released: 14 August 2007; Label: Mute, Vandit; Format: CD, vinyl, digital download, DVD	20	187	—	48	88	63	2
Evolution	Released: 3 April 2012; Label: Armada, Vandit; Format: CD, vinyl, digital download	22	—	—	78	49	—	13
The Politics of Dancing 3	Released: 4 May 2015; Label: Ultra, Vandit; Format: CD, digital download	76	—	—	—	—	—	8
From Then On	Released: 20 October 2017; Label: Vandit; Format: CD, digital download, vinyl	45	—	—	—	82	—	—
Music Rescues Me	Released: 7 December 2018; Label: Vandit; Format: CD, digital download	70	—	—	—	—	—	—
Guiding Light	Released: 28 August 2020; Label: Vandit; Format: Digital download	—	—	—	—	75	—	—
This World Is Ours	Released: 11 April 2025; Label: Vandit; Format: CD, digital download, vinyl							
"—" denotes releases that did not chart or was not released

=== Ambient album ===
Title	Album details
Escape Reality	Released: April 17, 2020; Label: Vandit; Formats: Digital download

=== Soundtrack albums ===
Title	Album details
Zurdo (Musica Original De La Pelicula)	Released: October 14, 2003; Label: Universal; Formats: CD

=== Remix albums ===
Title	Album details
Re-Reflections	Released: August 30, 2004; Label: Mute, Universal, Vandit; Formats: CD
Hands on in Between	Released: November 24, 2008; Label: Mute, Vandit; Formats: CD, digital download
(R)evolution: The Remixes	Released: February 22, 2013; Label: Armada, Vandit; Formats: CD, digital download
The Politics of Dancing 3 (Remixes)	Released: December 11, 2015; Label: Ultra, Vandit; Formats: CD, digital download

=== Compilation albums ===
- 1997: Perspective - A Collection Of Remixes 1992–1997
- 1998: Vorsprung Dyk Technik: Remixes 92-98, BPI: Silver
- 1999: Paul van Dyk's Nervous Tracks
- 2002: Global
- 2004: Perfect Remixes Vol. 2
- 2008: 10 Years GMF Compilation
- 2009: Volume(GER #18), (UK #34), (AUS #153) (AUT #69)

=== DJ mixes ===
- 1993: X-Mix-1- The MFS Trip
- 1999: 60 Minute Mix
- 2001: The Politics of Dancing (AUS #151) (FIN #30)
- 2003: Mixmag (Mixmag DJ mix)
- 2005: The Politics of Dancing 2
- 2005: Paul van Dyk (subtitled Exclusive 12 Track Trance Mix) (Mixmag DJ mix)
- 2005: Paul van Dyk DJ Mag Compilation
- 2008: Cream Ibiza 2008
- 2009: Vonyc Sessions 2009
- 2010: Gatecrasher Anthems, BPI: Silver
- 2010: Vonyc Sessions 2010
- 2010: Paul van Dyk Presents: 10 of Years VANDIT
- 2011: Vonyc Sessions 2011
- 2012: Vonyc Sessions 2012
- 2013: Vonyc Sessions 2013
- 2014: Paul van Dyk Presents: VANDIT Records Miami 2014

=== Video albums ===
Title	Album details
Global	Released: February 11, 2003; Label: Mute; Formats: DVD, CD

== Extended plays ==
Title	Album details
The Green Valley	Released: June 24, 1994; Label: MFS; Formats: CD, 12"
Columbia	Released: September 24, 2001; Label: Mute, Vandit; Formats: CD, 12"

== Singles ==
Title	Year	Peak chart positions										Certifications	Album
Title	Year	GER	AUS	AUT	BEL	CIS	FIN	IRE	NED	SUI	UK	Certifications	Album
"Pumpin'"	1994	—	—	—	—	—	—	—	—	—	—		45 RPM
"Rendezvous" (vs. Tilt)	1996	—	—	—	—	—	—	—	—	—	—		Non-album single
"Beautiful Place"	1997	—	—	—	—	—	—	—	—	—	82		Seven Ways
"Forbidden Fruit"	1997	—	—	—	—	—	—	—	—	—	69		Seven Ways
"Words" (featuring Toni Halliday)	1997	—	—	—	—	—	—	—	—	—	54		Seven Ways
"For an Angel"	1998	44	104	—	—	45	—	26	54	—	28		45 RPM
"Another Way" / "Avenue"	1999	52	56	—	—	—	—	26	61	94	13		Out There and Back
"Tell Me Why (The Riddle)" (featuring Saint Etienne)	2000	45	57	—	—	—	15	19	—	82	7		Out There and Back
"We Are Alive"	2000	14	89	49	—	—	—	22	29	—	15		Out There and Back
"Nothing But You" (featuring Hemstock & Jennings)	2003	11	83	—	—	—	16	—	3	76	14		Reflections
"Time of Our Lives" / "Connected" (featuring Vega 4)	2003	14	100	47	—	—	—	—	64	70	28		Reflections
"Crush" (featuring Second Sun)	2004	48	91	—	—	—	—	—	89	—	42		Reflections
"Wir Sind Wir" (featuring Peter Heppner)	2004	13	—	75	—	—	—	—	—	—	—		Re-Reflections
"The Other Side" (featuring Wayne Jackson)	2005	29	69	—	—	—	11	—	40	—	58		The Politics of Dancing 2
"White Lies" (featuring Jessica Sutta)	2007	38	109	73	—	133	10	—	—	—	80		In Between
"Let Go" (featuring Rea Garvey)	2007	21	—	—	—	2	—	—	—	—	—		In Between
"For an Angel 2009"	2009	21	—	31	—	7	—	—	—	—	68	BPI: Platinum	Volume
"Home" (featuring Johnny McDaid)	2009	64	—	—	—	138	—	—	—	—	—		Volume
"Verano" (featuring Austin Leeds)	2012	—	—	—	—	—	—	—	—	—	—		Evolution
"Eternity" (featuring Adam Young)	2012	—	—	—	—	175	—	—	—	—	—		Evolution
"The Ocean" (featuring Arty)	2012	—	—	106	—	—	—	—	—	—	—		Evolution
"I Don't Deserve You" (featuring Plumb)	2012	—	—	—	—	196	—	—	—	—	—		Evolution
"We Are One 2013" (featuring Arnej)	2013	—	—	—	—	—	—	—	—	—	—		Non-album single
"We Are Tonight" (featuring Christian Burns)	2013	—	—	—	—	86	—	—	—	—	—		Simple Modern Answers
"Come with Me (We Are One 2014)" (with Ummet Ozcan)	2014	—	—	—	—	—	—	—	—	—	—		The Politics of Dancing 3
"Only in a Dream" (with Jessus & Adham Ashraf featuring Tricia McTeague)	2014	—	—	—	—	—	—	—	—	—	—		The Politics of Dancing 3
"Guardian" (with Aly & Fila featuring Sue McLaren)	2014	—	—	—	—	—	—	—	—	—	—		The Politics of Dancing 3
"Louder" (with Roger Shah featuring Daphne Khoo)	2015	—	—	—	—	—	—	—	—	—	—		The Politics of Dancing 3
"What We're Livin For" (with Michael Tsukerman featuring Patrick Droney)	2015	—	—	—	—	—	—	—	—	—	—		The Politics of Dancing 3
"For You" (with Genix)	2015	—	—	—	—	—	—	—	—	—	—		The Politics of Dancing 3
"Lights" (featuring Sue McLaren)	2015	—	—	—	—	—	—	—	—	—	—		The Politics of Dancing 3
"Together Again" (with Sue McLaren & Farhad Mahdavi)	2016	—	—	—	—	—	—	—	—	—	—		Non-album single
"Berlinition" (with Chris Bekker & Chris Montana)	2016	—	—	—	—	—	—	—	—	—	—		Berlinition
"We Are" (with Alex M.O.R.P.H.)	2016	—	—	—	—	—	—	—	—	—	—		Not All Superheroes Wear Capes
"Everyone Needs Love" (with Ronald van Gelderen featuring Gaelan & Eric Lumiere)	2016	—	—	—	—	—	—	—	—	—	—		From Then On
"Touched by Heaven"	2017	—	—	—	—	—	—	—	—	—	—		From Then On
"Stronger Together" (with Pierre Pienaar)	2017	—	—	—	—	—	—	—	—	—	—		From Then On
"I Am Alive"	2017	—	—	—	—	—	—	—	—	—	—		From Then On
"Shine Ibiza Anthem 2018" (as Shine)	2018	—	—	—	—	—	—	—	—	—	—		Non-album single
"Music Rescues Me" (featuring Plumb)	2018	—	—	—	—	—	—	—	—	—	—		Music Rescues Me
"Voyager" (with Alex M.O.R.P.H.)	2018	—	—	—	—	—	—	—	—	—	—		Music Rescues Me
"Moments with You" (with Rafael Osmo)	2018	—	—	—	—	—	—	—	—	—	—		Music Rescues Me
"Aurora" (with Steve Dekay)	2019	—	—	—	—	—	—	—	—	—	—		Music Rescues Me
"Accelerator" (with Jordan Suckley)	2019	—	—	—	—	—	—	—	—	—	—		Music Rescues Me
"Shine Ibiza Anthem 2019" (with Alex M.O.R.P.H.)	2019	—	—	—	—	—	—	—	—	—	—		Non-album singles
"Galaxy" (with Vini Vici)	2019	—	—	—	—	—	—	—	—	—	—		Non-album singles
"Parallel Dimension" (with Elated)	2019	—	—	—	—	—	—	—	—	—	—		Guiding Light
"Duality"	2020	—	—	—	—	—	—	—	—	—	—		Guiding Light
"Guiding Light" (with Sue McLaren)	2020	—	—	—	—	—	—	—	—	—	—		Guiding Light
"Wishful Thinking" (with Kolonie)	2021	—	—	—	—	—	—	—	—	—	—		Non-album singles
"In Your Arms (For an Angel)" (with Topic, Robin Schulz and Nico Santos)	2022	36	—	—	—	7	—	—	—	61	—		Non-album singles
"—" denotes a recording that did not chart or was not released in that territory.

== Music videos ==
- My World
- Pump This Party
- Forbidden Fruit
- For an Angel
- Another Way
- Tell Me Why (The Riddle) (featuring Saint Etienne)
- We Are Alive
- Nothing But You (featuring Hemstock & Jennings)
- Time of Our Lives (featuring Vega 4)
- Crush (featuring Second Sun)
- Wir Sind Wir (featuring Peter Heppner)
- The Other Side (featuring Wayne Jackson)
- White Lies (Paul van Dyk song) (featuring Jessica Sutta)
- Let Go (featuring Rea Garvey)
- For An Angel 2009
- Home (featuring Johnny McDaid)
- Verano (featuring Austin Leeds)
- Eternity (featuring Adam Young)
- The Ocean (featuring Arty)
- I Don't Deserve You (featuring Plumb)
- I Don't Deserve You (featuring Plumb) (Seven Lions Remix)
- Crush (featuring Second Sun) (Las Salinas Remix)
- Come With Me (We Are One 2014) (with Ummet Ozcan)
- Only In A Dream (with Jessus & Adham Ashraf featuring Tricia McTeague)
- Louder (Lyrics) (with Roger Shah featuring Daphne Khoo)
- Lights (featuring Sue McLaren)
- Berlinition (with Chris Bekker & Chris Montana)
- Touched By Heaven
- Stronger Together
- I Am Alive
- Music Rescues Me
- Duality

== Co-productions ==
- The Visions Of Shiva (with Cosmic Baby)
  - 1992 Perfect Day
  - 1993 How Much Can You Take?
- Dolfin' (with Paul Schmitz-Moormann and Stephan Fischer)
  - 1993 Elation (Abstractmix)
- Tilt vs. Paul van Dyk
  - 1996 Rendezvous (Quadrophonic Mix)
- BT
  - 1997 Flaming June (BT and PvD Mix)
- DJ's United (with Armin van Buuren and Paul Oakenfold)
  - 2010 Remember Love
- Christian Burns and Paul van Dyk
  - 2013 We Are Tonight
- Sue McLaren, Farhad Mohavi and Paul van Dyk
  - 2016 Together Again
- Chris Bekker, Chris Montana and Paul van Dyk
  - 2016 Berlinition
- Giuseppe Ottaviani, Paul van Dyk and Sue McLaren
  - 2016 Miracle
- Alex M.O.R.P.H. and Paul van Dyk
  - 2016 We Are
- Will Atkinson and Paul van Dyk
  - 2020 Awakening

== Remixes ==
- "Poor Choice of Words" — Hans Zimmer & James Newton Howard
- "Still Alive" — Lisa Miskovsky
- "What Goes Around... Comes Around" — Justin Timberlake
- "Gimme More" — Britney Spears
- "1998" — Binary Finary
- "Burn It Down" — Linkin Park
- "Losing My Mind" — Tritonal and Haliene
