= For an Angel =

Single by Paul van Dyk

from the album 45 RPM
- Released: 5 December 1998 (UK: 24 August 1998)
- Genre: Trance
- Length: 7:46
- Label: MFS; Deviant
- Songwriter: Paul van Dyk
- Producer: Paul van Dyk

Paul van Dyk singles chronology
"Words" (1997)	"For an Angel" (1998)	"Another Way/Avenue" (1999)
"Let Go" (2007)	"For an Angel 2009" (2009)	"Home" (2009)

Music video
- "For an Angel" on YouTube

"For an Angel" is a trance song by German DJ Paul van Dyk, which served as his debut track and would become his most famous work. The song was initially released in 1994 as a track on 45 RPM on the MFS record label, which was van Dyk's first studio album. It was later reworked and re-released in 1998 as the "E-Werk Remix" on Deviant Records, a homage to the E-Werk nightclub where van Dyk used to be the resident DJ. This version was number one on the UK Dance Chart for several weeks. Since its release, the track has become one of the greatest and most influential trance tracks of all time. It was voted as the eighth greatest dance record of all time by Mixmag readers.

A 2009 release titled "For an Angel 2009" containing the "PvD Remix '09" and other remixes reached the top 10 in Russia and the top 40 in Germany and Austria.

In an August 2024 interview with DJ Mag, van Dyk discussed the production of "For an Angel" which he completed with a Roland Juno-60, a Roland Juno-106, a Roland JX-1 and a Roland TR-808.

== Music video ==
Three music videos exist for the track; one from 1998, filmed in the Riviera Maya in Mexico. In this video, Paul van Dyk, dressed in Malibu clothing, is seen sitting under a palm tree on the beach, in a river and other various locations, and later watching local children playing football on the beach. Also appearing are various short clips of the scenery surrounding him. This video is available on van Dyk's Global album. The next video, also from 1998, features footage from the Love Parade in Berlin. The third, from 2009, was filmed at an exhibition in L.A. and Berlin.

== Track listing ==
- UK 12" single (1998)
1. "For an Angel" (PvD E-Werk club mix) – (7:43)
2. "For an Angel" (Way Out West mix) – (5:48)
3. "For an Angel" (Terry Lee Brown Jnr mix) – (6:28)

== Charts ==
=== Weekly charts ===
Chart (1998)	Peak position
Australia (ARIA)	104
Belgium (Ultratop 50 Flanders)	45
Europe (Eurochart Hot 100 Singles)	74
Germany (GfK)	44
Ireland (IRMA)	26
Netherlands (Single Top 100)	54
Scottish Singles Sales (Official Charts)	18
UK Singles (Official Charts)	28
UK Dance (Official Charts)	1
UK Indie (Official Charts)	3

Chart (2009)	Peak position
Austria (Ö3 Austria Top 40)	31
CIS Airplay (TopHit)	7
Germany (GfK)	21
Russia Airplay (TopHit)	4
UK Singles (Official Charts)	68
UK Indie (Official Charts)	7

=== Year-end charts ===
Chart (2009)	Position
CIS (TopHit)	56
Russia Airplay (TopHit)	19

Chart (2010)	Position
Russia Airplay (TopHit)	39

=== Decade-end charts ===
Decade-end chart performance for "For an Angel"
Chart (2000–2009)	Position
Russia Airplay (TopHit)	139

== Certifications ==
Region	Certification	Certified units/sales
United Kingdom (BPI)	Platinum	600,000^{‡}
^{‡} Sales+streaming figures based on certification alone.

== Other versions ==
The song was sampled in British singer Rachel McFarlane's 1998 song "Lover", which in turn has been mashed up with "For an Angel" by DJs in their club sets and bootleg releases.

In 2022, the song was sampled in "In Your Arms (For an Angel)" by Topic, Robin Schulz and Nico Santos; van Dyk was also credited and included as a main artist.
