= Patterns of Force (disambiguation) =

"Patterns of Force" is a 1968 episode of Star Trek: The Original Series.

Patterns of Force may also refer to:

- Patterns of Force (novel), a 2009 Star Wars novel of the Coruscant Nights trilogy
- A record released by Ten Forward via the independent German MFS label
