= The Politics of Dancing 3 =

Studio album by Paul van Dyk
- Released: 4 May 2015
- Recorded: 2013–15
- Genres: Dance; trance; progressive trance
- Labels: Ultra; Vandit
- Producers: Paul van Dyk; Aly & Fila; Ummet Ozcan; Giuseppe Ottaviani; Las Salinas; Roger Shah; Jordan Suckley; Ben Nicky; Genix; Michael Tsukerman

Paul van Dyk chronology
(R)Evolution: The Remixes (2013)	The Politics of Dancing 3 (2015)	From Then On (2017)

Singles from The Politics of Dancing 3
- 1. "Come With Me (We Are One)" Released: 8 August 2014; 2. "Only In A Dream" Released: 7 November 2014; 3. "Guardian" Released: 2 February 2015; 4. "Louder" Released: 2 March 2015; 5. "Lights" Released: 14 August 2015

Professional ratings
Review scores
Source	Rating
AllMusic	3.5/5 stars

The Politics of Dancing 3 is the seventh studio album by Paul van Dyk, released on 4 May 2015 by Ultra Music and Vandit. The album features many collaborations including Aly & Fila, Ummet Ozcan, Giuseppe Ottaviani, Las Salinas, Roger Shah, Jordan Suckley, and Sue McLaren.

The album is the third album from Paul van Dyk's legendary compilation The Politics of Dancing series (the first was released in 2001 and the second in 2005). Paul van Dyk said about the album : “The third Politics of Dancing’s sound is, to me, more about what I’m about than the first two albums even. With them, I took music from other people and mixed, remixed and articulated it into the releases. Now we’re talking about tracks that I’ve written and co-written with other artists. So this is pretty much my idea of what electronic music should sound like now. "Politics" is almost like a "sound dictionary" of where I’m at musically. For me it continues the theme/thread of the first two, whilst acknowledging the passage of time between the then and the now.”.

The album includes collaborations such as: Come With Me (We Are One) (with Ummet Ozcan), Lights (featuring Sue McLaren), Guardian (with Aly & Fila, featuring Sue McLaren) and Louder (with Roger Shah, featuring Daphne Khoo).

== Track listing ==
No.	Title	Length
1.	"Heart Like An Ocean" (with Mark Eteson) (featuring Tricia McTeague)	6:56
2.	"Lights" (featuring Sue McLaren)	6:20
3.	"My World" (with FKN & Mohamed Ragab) (featuring Jahala)	6:00
4.	"Mino Safy – Around The Garden" (Paul van Dyk Remix)	6:30
5.	"What We're Livin For" (with Michael Tsukerman) (featuring Patrick Droney)	4:25
6.	"In Your Arms" (with Giuseppe Ottaviani) (featuring Fisher)	5:42
7.	"Come With Me" (We Are One) (Paul van Dyk Festival Mix) (with Ummet Ozcan)	2:32
8.	"Guardian" (with Aly & Fila) (featuring Sue McLaren)	7:19
9.	"Love Is" (with Las Salinas) (featuring Betsie Larkin)	4:45
10.	"For You" (with Genix)	6:57
11.	"Follow Me" (with Stoneface & Terminal)	6:14
12.	"City Of Sound" (with Jordan Suckley)	6:58
13.	"Only In A Dream" (PvD Club Mix) (with Jessus & Adham Ashraf) (featuring Tricia McTeague)	4:00
14.	"Louder" (PvD vs. Ben Nicky Remix) (with Roger Shah) (featuring Daphne Khoo)	3:58

iTunes Store edition
No.	Title	Length
15.	"The Politics of Dancing 3" (Continuous DJ Mix)	1:07:48
