= Traffic jam (disambiguation) =

A traffic jam is a colloquial term for traffic congestion.

Traffic jam may also refer to:

- Traffic Jam (film), a 1979 Italian film
- "Traffic Jam" (Malcolm in the Middle episode)
- "Traffic Jam" (King of the Hill episode)
- "Traffic Jam", a song by "Weird Al" Yankovic from the album Alapalooza
- "Traffic Jam", a song by Bappi Lahiri from the Hindi film Rock Dancer
- "Traffic Jam", a song by Vega4 from the album You and Others
- Traffic Jam, an early name of the band Status Quo
- "Traffic Jam", an episode of the TV series Pocoyo
