= (R)evolution: The Remixes =

(R)Evolution: The Remixes

Remix album by Paul van Dyk
- Released: February 22, 2013
- Genre: Electronic dance music
- Label: Vandit
- Producer: Paul van Dyk

Paul van Dyk chronology
Evolution (2012)	(R)Evolution: The Remixes (2013)	The Politics of Dancing 3 (2015)

(R)Evolution: The Remixes is a remix album from German trance producer and DJ Paul van Dyk released on 22 February 2013. The album consists of 18 selected remixes of songs from the original Evolution album in 2012.

== Track listing ==
No.	Title	Length
1.	"Such a Feeling (Alex M.O.R.P.H. Remix)" (feat. Austin Leeds & Elijah King)	7:10
2.	"I Don't Deserve You (John O'Callaghan Remix)" (feat. Plumb)	7:31
3.	"Symmetries (Maarten de Jong Remix)" (feat. Austin Leeds)	7:14
4.	"Lost in Berlin (Giuseppe Ottaviani Remix)" (feat. Michelle Leonard)	7:33
5.	"The Sun After Heartbreak (Pedro Del Mar & Double V Remix)" (feat. Sue McLaren & Arty)	6:54
6.	"All the Way (Steve Wish Remix)" (feat. Tyler Michaud & Fisher)	6:11
7.	"If You Want My Love (Niels von Ahorn Remix)" (feat. Caligola)	7:00
8.	"A Wonderful Day (Robert Mint Remix)" (feat. Giuseppe Ottaviani)	5:36
9.	"We Come Together (Chriss Ortega Remix)" (feat. Sue McLaren)	7:48
10.	"The Sun After Heartbreak (Woody van Eyden Remix)" (feat. Sue McLaren & Arty)	6:33
11.	"I Don't Deserve You (Gabriel Ben Remix)" (feat. Plumb)	7:42
12.	"Love Ammunition (Directors Cut Mix)" (feat. Michelle Leonard)	6:45
13.	"Rock This (Exense Remix)"	7:00
14.	"Open My Eyes (Kyau & Albert Remix)" (feat. Kyau & Albert)	6:22
15.	"The Sun After Heartbreak (Nick Callaghan & Will Atkinson Remix)" (feat. Sue McLaren & Arty)	9:02
16.	"I Don't Deserve You (WAWA Remix)" (feat. Plumb)	5:27
17.	"Such a Feeling (Radio Edit)" (feat. Austin Leeds & Elijah King)	2:57
18.	"Verano (Austin Leeds Remix)" (feat. Austin Leeds)	6:23
