= My Sister's Keeper (film) =

2009 film by Nick Cassavetes

- Theatrical release poster
- Directed by: Nick Cassavetes
- Screenplay by: Jeremy Leven; Nick Cassavetes
- Based on: My Sister’s Keeper by Jodi Picoult
- Produced by: Stephen Furst; Scott Goldman; Mark Johnson; Chuck Pacheco; Mendel Tropper
- Starring: Cameron Diaz; Abigail Breslin; Alec Baldwin; Jason Patric; Sofia Vassilieva; Joan Cusack
- Cinematography: Caleb Deschanel
- Edited by: Jim Flynn; Alan Heim
- Music by: Aaron Zigman
- Production companies: New Line Cinema; Curmudgeon Films
- Distributed by: Warner Bros. Pictures
- Release date: June 26, 2009
- Running time: 109 minutes
- Country: United States
- Language: English
- Budget: $30 million
- Box office: $92.7 million

My Sister's Keeper is a 2009 American legal melodrama film directed by Nick Cassavetes and starring Cameron Diaz, Abigail Breslin, Alec Baldwin, Jason Patric, Sofia Vassilieva, and Joan Cusack. The film is based on Jodi Picoult's 2004 novel of the same name, which is also based on Marissa and Anissa Ayala.

On June 26, 2009, the film was released theatrically in the United States by Warner Bros. Pictures. The film grossed $92.7 million against a $30 million budget while receiving mixed reviews from critics.

== Plot ==
Young Kate Fitzgerald is diagnosed with acute promyelocytic leukemia, devastating her parents, firefighter Brian and lawyer Sara. As neither of them nor Kate's older brother Jesse are genetic matches for her, Brian and Sara conceive a savior sister, Anna, through in vitro fertilization.

Beginning with the harvest of her umbilical cord at birth, Anna has donated compatible blood and stem cells to Kate, and her life has been full of hospitalizations, growth hormone injections, opioid painkillers, sleeping pills, bleeding, and infections. Sara has no qualms over using Anna's body to treat Kate's and fully believes Anna is a willing donor, while Brian, who is closer to Anna, has his misgivings. Kate also shares a close relationship with Anna, and secretly feels guilty for the ways in which her illness has affected her siblings – for example, Jesse's dyslexia went unnoticed for years as Kate received all of their parents' attention, causing his grades to suffer.

At age fifteen, Kate goes into kidney failure, requiring 11-year-old Anna to donate one of her kidneys, which will severely impact her quality of life. With Jesse's help, Anna approaches attorney Campbell Alexander to sue her parents for medical emancipation. The secretly epileptic Campbell sympathizes with Anna's feeling of not having control over her own body, and takes her case pro bono. Representing Anna as her guardian ad litem, he files a suit for partial termination of parental rights. When this causes a rift between Anna and Sara, Brian moves Anna into his fire station to separate them.

A series of flashbacks reveals that prior to Kate's kidney failure, she met and began dating fellow cancer patient Taylor. After attending a hospital prom for teen patients, they had sex for the first time; Taylor died shortly afterward. Distraught by Taylor's death, Kate attempted suicide by overdosing on painkillers before being stopped by Anna.

In the present, Sara fails to get the suit thrown out, so it proceeds to trial. Shortly before the hearing, Kate requests one last trip to the beach. Brian discharges her from the hospital for the day. Sara initially objects, but after Brian threatens to divorce her if she does not join them, they all enjoy one final family outing.

At the hearing, Jesse intervenes during Sara's aggressive cross-examination of Anna and forces Anna to confess that she is acting under Kate's wishes instead of her own. While Anna had originally been willing to donate her kidney, Kate asked her to refuse, knowing she would not survive another operation and having endured enough of both her own and her family's suffering. Finally acknowledging that Kate is ready to die, Sara says a final goodbye to her, and Kate dies in her sleep with her mother by her side.

After Kate's death, Campbell reports that Anna has won the case. Now reconciled, the family moves on with their lives. Sara, who gave up practicing law to look after Kate, returns to work, Brian retires from firefighting and counsels troubled youths, and Jesse enters college. Every year on Kate's birthday, the family goes to Montana, which was Kate's "most favorite place in the world". In a voice-over, Anna concludes that she was not born merely to save her sister; she was born because she had a sister, and that their relationship continues even in death.

== Cast ==
- Cameron Diaz as Sara Fitzgerald
- Abigail Breslin as Anna Fitzgerald
  - Olivia Jade Fine as 6-year-old Anna
- Alec Baldwin as Campbell Alexander
- Joan Cusack as Judge Joan De Salvo
- Jason Patric as Brian Fitzgerald
- Sofia Vassilieva as Kate Fitzgerald
  - Olivia Hancock as 2-year-old Kate
- Evan Ellingson as Jesse Fitzgerald
  - Paul Christopher Butler as 3-year-old Jesse
  - Brennan Bailey as 10-year-old Jesse
- Heather Wahlquist as Kelly Fitzgerald
- Thomas Dekker as Taylor Ambrose
- David Thornton as Dr. Harrison
- Emily Deschanel as Dr. Farquad
- E. G. Daily as Nurse Susan
- Michael Chow as Dr. Chow

== Production ==
Sisters Dakota and Elle Fanning were originally cast to play Kate and Anna respectively, until Dakota learned that she would be required to shave her head for the role. She dropped out of the film as did Elle. Jodi Picoult said in interview she regretted letting Nick Cassavetes direct the film, as he changed its ending from her novel. In the novel Anna gains medical emancipation and indicates to Campbell that she wishes to donate a kidney to Kate anyway, but is killed in a car crash on the way home from court. Campbell approves the organ transplant and Kate's life is saved.

== Reception ==
=== Critical response ===
My Sister's Keeper received mixed reviews from critics. Review aggregator Rotten Tomatoes reports that 47% of reviews for the film were positive, based on 139 reviews, with an average rating of 5.50/10. The website's critical consensus reads, "My Sister's Keeper gets fine performances from its adult and child actors, but the director's heavy-handed approach turns a worthy emotional subject into an overly melodramatic tearjerker." Another aggregator, Metacritic, reported a weighted average score of 51 out of 100, based on 28 reviews, indicating "mixed or average reviews". Audiences polled by CinemaScore gave the film an average grade of "A-" on an A+ to F scale.

=== Box office ===
In its opening weekend, it placed fifth with a total of $12,442,212, behind Transformers: Revenge of the Fallen, The Proposal (second weekend), The Hangover (fourth weekend), and Up (fifth weekend). The film left theatres on October 8, 2009, with a domestic total of $49,200,230 with a further $46,459,927 from foreign markets. It grossed $95,660,157 worldwide.

=== Awards ===
Year	Award	Category	Recipient	Result
2009	Teen Choice Award	Choice Summer Movie Drama	My Sister's Keeper	Won
2009	ALMA Awards	Outstanding Actress in Motion Picture	Cameron Diaz	Won
2010	Young Artist Awards	Best Performance in a Feature Film – Leading Young Actress	Abigail Breslin	Won
2010	Young Artist Awards	Best Performance in a Feature Film – Supporting Actor	Brennan Bailey	Nominated
2010	Young Artist Awards	Best Performance in a Feature Film – Supporting Actress	Sofia Vassilieva	Won

== Soundtrack ==
No.	Title	Writer(s)	Artist(s)	Length
1.	"Feels Like Home"	Randy Newman	Edwina Hayes	4:17
2.	"Don't Wanna Cry"	Pete Yorn	Pete Yorn	3:56
3.	"Better"	Regina Spektor	Regina Spektor	3:10
4.	"Life Is Beautiful"	Lee, Gainsford, McDaid, McLellan, Walker, Banbury	Vega 4	6:16
5.	"Carry You Home"	James Blunt, Max Martin	James Blunt	3:55
6.	"We All Fall in Love Sometimes"	Elton John, Bernie Taupin	Jeff Buckley	5:42
7.	"Girls Just Want to Have Fun"	Robert Hazard	Greg Laswell	2:37
8.	"Find My Way Back Home"	Priscilla Ahn	Priscilla Ahn	2:27
9.	"With You"	Johnson, Zigman, Hart	Jonah Johnson	3:54
10.	"Life Is Just a Bowl of Cherries"	Ray Henderson, Lew Brown	E. G. Daily	2:06
11.	"Heaven"	David Byrne, Jerry Harrison	Jimmy Scott	4:57
12.	"Amazing Grace"	John Newton	Pipe Major Jim Drury, Julia McGurk	2:31
Total length:				45:42

=== Other songs in the film ===
- Don Ho – "Tiny Bubbles"
- Phil X – "Kill Me"
- Hana Pestle – "These Two Hands"

=== Songs from the TV spot ===
- Plain White T's – "1, 2, 3, 4"
- Tyrone Wells – "More"
