= 45 RPM (album) =

Studio album by Paul van Dyk
- Released: December 5, 1994 December 5, 1998
- Genres: Trance, techno, electro, house, dance
- Labels: MFS (Germany); Deviant (UK); Mute (U.S.)
- Producers: Paul van Dyk; Johnny Klimek; Voov

Paul van Dyk chronology
45 RPM (1994)	Seven Ways (1996)

Singles from 45 RPM
- 1. "For an Angel" Released: August 24, 1998

Professional ratings
Review scores
Source	Rating
AllMusic	3.5/5 stars

45 RPM is the debut album by Paul van Dyk. It was released in Germany on the MFS label on December 5, 1994. It was then released on Deviant Records in the UK and Mute Records in the US in 1998.

Initial copies of the German album came with a bonus disc of remixes van Dyk had done for other artists called 45 Remixes Per Minute. Among the artists featured on this disc are New Order and Inspiral Carpets.

== Track listings ==
Main disc
No.	Title	Length
1.	"Introjection"	4:05
2.	"I'm Comin' (To Take You Away)"	6:13
3.	"For an Angel" (vocals: Ute Lampka-Konrad)	6:22
4.	"45 RPM"	5:10
5.	"Spannung (Tension)"	6:58
6.	"Emergency!"	6:01
7.	"Rushin' (Revolutions Per Minute)"	6:29
8.	"Pump This Party (Video Edit)"	6:13
9.	"Ooh! La La! (Krankenhouse Mix)"	6:13
10.	"A Magical Moment"	6:01
11.	"Pump This 45"	5:25
12.	"Ejeculoutro"	4:11

Bonus disc
No.	Title	Writer(s)	Length
1.	"Punishing the Atoms (Paul van Dyk Remix)"	Effective Force	6:19
2.	"Child 2 (Summer Love Remix)"	Tranceparents	8:09
3.	"Spooky (Out of Order – Specially Extended Version)"	New Order	6:32
4.	"Take a Free Fall (Beyond the Stars Re-Mix)"	Dance 2 Trance	7:10
5.	"You Can't Escape (Paul van Dyk Remix)"	Jens Lissat	7:06
6.	"Playing With the Voice in Germany (Paul van Dyk Remix)"	Joe T. Vannelli	8:04
7.	"Saturn 5 (Gravity Surge Mix)"	Inspiral Carpets	6:02
8.	"Kontrol (Paul van Dyk Remix)"	Sarin International	5:56
9.	"Sugar Daddy (Tripping on the Moon Remix)"	Secret Knowledge	6:16
10.	"My World (Pump the Universe Remix)"	Paul van Dyk	5:13
