= Reflections (Paul van Dyk album) =

Studio album by Paul van Dyk
- Released: 7 October 2003
- Genre: Trance
- Label: Urban; Positiva; Mute
- Producer: Paul van Dyk

Paul van Dyk chronology
Global (2003)	Reflections (2003)	The Politics of Dancing 2 (2005)

Singles from Reflections
- 1. "Nothing But You" Released: 25 March 2003; 2. "Time of Our Lives" / "Connected" Released: 18 November 2003; 3. "Crush" Released: 29 March 2004

Professional ratings
Review scores
Source	Rating
AllMusic	2.5/5 stars
About.com	3.5/5 stars
Resident Advisor	4.5/5 stars
Rolling Stone	3/5 stars
Tiny Mix Tapes	1.5/5 marks

Reflections is the fourth studio album by German music producer and DJ Paul van Dyk. It was released on 7 October 2003 by Urban Records, Positiva Records and Mute Records. The album received a Grammy Award nomination in the category Best Dance/Electronica Album.

== Track listing ==
Standard version
No.	Title	Writer(s)	Length
1.	"Crush" (featuring Second Sun)	Paul van Dyk; Adam Cavaluzi; Antoine Toupin	7:46
2.	"Time of Our Lives" (featuring Vega4)	van Dyk; John McDaid; Simon Walker	4:23
3.	"Like a Friend" (featuring Jan Johnston)	van Dyk; Jan Johnston	3:54
4.	"Reflections"	van Dyk	7:27
5.	"Nothing But You" (featuring Hemstock & Jennings)	van Dyk; Les Hemstock; Johnston; Chris Jennings	6:57
6.	"Buenaventura"	van Dyk	8:28
7.	"Homage" (featuring Jan Johnston)	van Dyk; Johnston	3:44
8.	"Never Forget" (featuring Stinka)	van Dyk	5:26
9.	"Knowledge" (featuring Atomek Dogg and Trooper da Don)	van Dyk; Atomek Dogg; Toyin Taylor	4:03
10.	"That's Life"	van Dyk	4:05
11.	"Connected"	van Dyk	6:35
12.	"Spellbound" (featuring Jan Johnston)	van Dyk; Johnston	4:42
13.	"Kaleidoscope" (featuring Jan Johnston)	van Dyk; Johnston	4:53
