= Evolution (Paul van Dyk album) =

Studio album by Paul van Dyk
- Released: April 3, 2012
- Recorded: 2010–2012
- Genre: Trance music, house music, progressive house, tech trance, uplifting trance, drum and bass, pop music
- Length: 77:31
- Label: Vandit
- Producer: Paul van Dyk; Austin LeedsArty; Ummet Ozcan; Tyler Michaud; Giuseppe Ottaviani

Paul van Dyk chronology
Hands on In Between (2008)	Evolution (2012)	(R)Evolution: The Remixes (2013)

Singles from Evolution
- 1. "Verano" Released: 20 February 2012; 2. "Eternity" Released: 8 March 2012; 3. "The Ocean" Released: 23 March 2012; 4. "I Don't Deserve You" Released: 25 September 2012

Professional ratings
Aggregate scores
Source	Rating
Metacritic	56/100
Review scores
Source	Rating
About.com	3.0/5 stars
AllMusic	3.5/5 stars
Blogcritics	(favourable)
The Daily Texan	(favourable)
Beatsmedia	(favourable)
Dancing Astronaut	(favourable)
EDMUpdate	5/5 stars
Live for the Drop	A−
thekeytothehouse	4/5 stars
Trance Hub	8/10
WNCT-TV	(favourable)
Partyflock	88/100

Evolution is the sixth studio album by Paul van Dyk released in April 2012. The album features a wide range of collaborations including Arty, Giuseppe Ottaviani, Adam Young, Austin Leeds, Plumb, Johnny McDaid's Fieldwork project, and Sue McLaren.

The album was preceded by a series of singles, each of them accompanied by a music video containing state-of-the-art visual effects. All the other tracks on the album are accompanied by a music video as well. "Verano" featuring producer Austin Leeds is the album's first single, released on the 20 February 2012, followed by the second single "Eternity" on 16 March 2012 which features vocals from Adam Young. "I Don't Deserve You" featuring vocals from Plumb was released several months after the release of the album.

== Track listing ==
No.	Title	Length
1.	"Symmetries" (feat. Austin Leeds)	5:40
2.	"The Ocean" (feat. Arty)	5:59
3.	"Eternity" (feat. Adam Young)	3:22
4.	"Verano" (feat. Austin Leeds)	4:31
5.	"I Don't Deserve You" (feat. Plumb)	6:45
6.	"The Sun After Heartbreak" (feat. Sue McLaren & Arty)	4:51
7.	"Rock This"	4:38
8.	"Dae Yor" (feat. Ummet Ozcan)	3:30
9.	"All the Way" (feat. Tyler Michaud & Fisher)	6:03
10.	"If You Want My Love" (feat. Caligola)	3:04
11.	"Lost in Berlin" (feat. Michelle Leonard)	6:36
12.	"Everywhere" (feat. Fieldwork)	6:34
13.	"A Wonderful Day" (feat. Giuseppe Ottaviani)	5:18
14.	"We Come Together" (feat. Sue McLaren)	5:45
15.	"Heart Stops Beating" (feat. Sarah Howells)	4:56

iTunes Store deluxe edition
No.	Title	Length
16.	"Love Ammunition" (feat. Michelle Leonard)	6:50
17.	"Senses"	5:47
18.	"Open My Eyes" (feat. Kyau & Albert)	5:56
19.	"Evolution"
20.	"Revival"
