= Life Is Beautiful (Vega4 song) =

"Life is Beautiful"

Single by Vega4

from the album You and Others
- Released: 2006
- Recorded: 2006
- Length: 6:15
- Label: Sony BMG
- Songwriters: Nic Cester, Cameron Muncey
- Producer: Jacknife Lee

Vega4 singles chronology
"Traffic Jam" (2006)	"Life is Beautiful" (2006)	"Tearing Me Apart" (2007)

"Life is Beautiful" is a song by the British rock band Vega4, featured on their 2006 album You and Others.

== Media usage ==
The song has been used in popular American television shows, such as Grey's Anatomy in the episode "Let the Angels Commit" from season 3. It was also featured in the episode "Prom Night at Hater High" in the fourth season of One Tree Hill, the season finale of Ghost Whisperer season 3 and the season 1 pilot of Raising the Bar.

This song was also used in the promotion of the first season of Pushing Daisies.

It was prominently featured in the trailer of My Sister's Keeper. The opening theme recurred in the teen comedy Sex Drive. The song also features in the hit British movie StreetDance 3D released May 2010. The song was in the trailer for Disneynature's African Cats released on 22 April 2011.

The song continues to gain use on television as the song played during the commercials promoting the ABC series Defying Gravity.

== Personnel ==
- Johnny McDaid – vocals and guitar
- Bryan McLellan – drums
- Bruce Gainsford – guitar
- Gavin Fox – bass
- Simon Walker – bass
