= E-Werk (Berlin) =

Nightclub in Berlin, Germany

Coordinates: 52°30′32″N 13°23′13″E

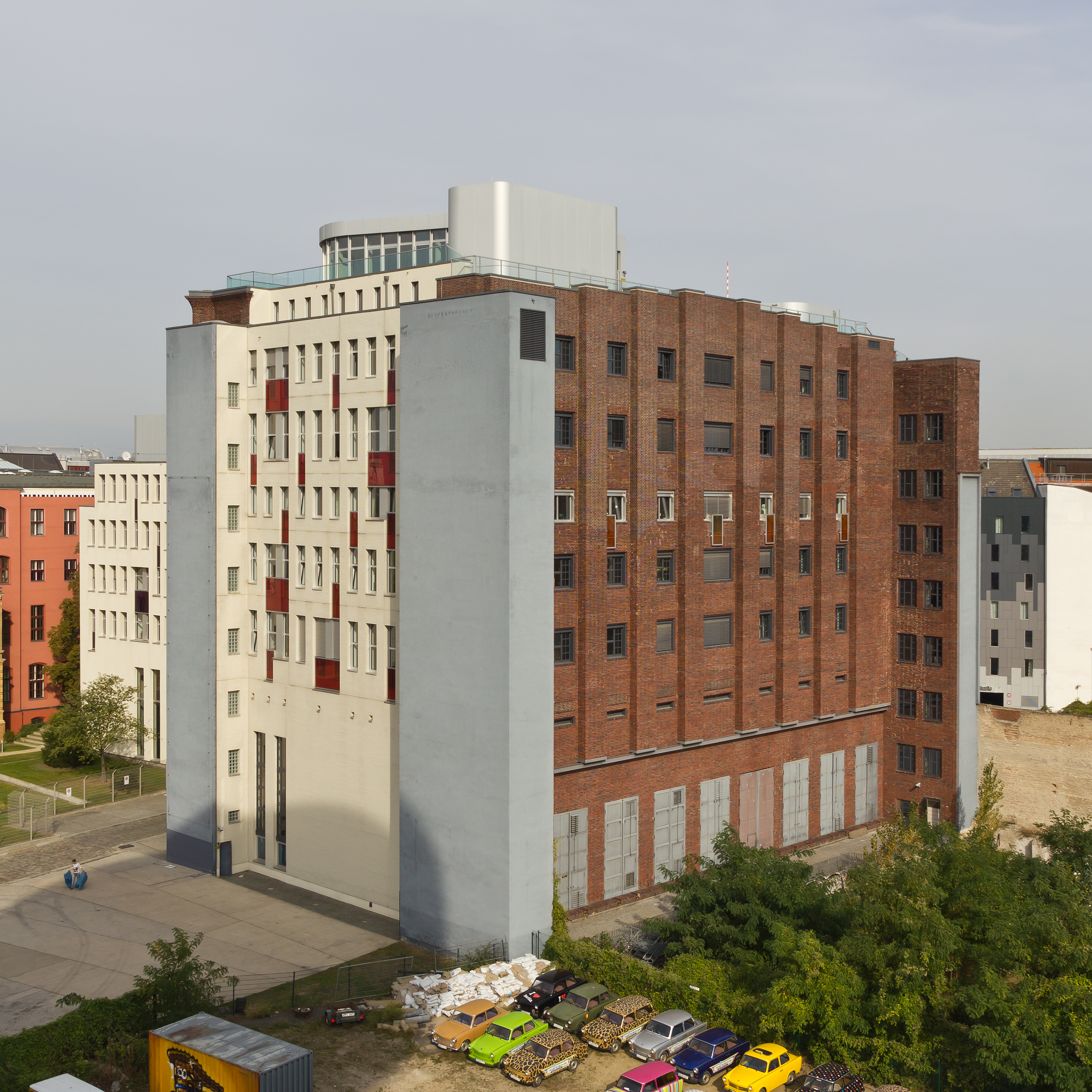
E-Werk in 2014

E-Werk was a techno music club in Berlin, Germany that was held in a former electrical substation called Abspannwerk Buchhändlerhof. Located near Checkpoint Charlie, it was an influential club in the techno subculture from 1993 to 1997 and was eventually transformed into an all-purpose venue.

== History ==
=== Techno club ===
The club was operated by Hille Saul, Andreas Rossmann, Ralf Regitz and Lee Waters, while permanent resident DJs were DJ Disko, DJ Clé, Jonzon, Woody, Terry Belle and English Hazel B. International DJs were invited to perform at club events. On Fridays, the "Dubmission" parties were held, with resident DJs Kid Paul and Paul Van Dyk. Van Dyk paid homage to the club in 1998 by naming the remix for one of his most notable tracks, "For An Angel", the "PvD E-Werk Club Mix".

=== Venue ===
On 24 July 1997 the substation building closed as a techno club; however, the building was refurbished and reopened in 2005. The heritage-protected area that the building is located in maintains the unique architecture that was based on the plans of architect Hans Heinrich Müller. The building, built between 1926 and 1928, was badly damaged during World War II, but in 2014 the original quadrant-shaped control room at its centre remains intact—it is considered the oldest surviving architectural remnant of Germany's electricity industry. Following refurbishment, the building is now used as a venue that spans across multiple levels.

In the 2001, the IT entrepreneur Holger Friedrich acquired the E-Werk from Bewag.

== See also ==
- List of electronic dance music venues
