= Global (Paul van Dyk album) =

Live album / Video album by Paul van Dyk
- Released: 2003-02-11
- Genre: Trance
- Label: Mute, Positiva, Urban
- Producer: Paul van Dyk, Jens Wojnar, Johnny Klimek

Paul van Dyk chronology
| The Politics of Dancing (2001) | Global (2003) | Reflections (2003) |

Professional ratings
Review scores
| Source | Rating |
|---|---|
| Allmusic | 2.5/5 stars |
| Rolling Stone | 3/5 stars |
| About.com | 4.5/5 stars |

Global is a DVD and CD set of Paul van Dyk's worldwide DJing tours. The CD is a music-only version of the DVD. DVD extras (not matched on the CD) include videos of Another Way, For An Angel, Forbidden Fruit, We Are Alive and Tell Me Why (The Riddle).

== Track listing ==
1. We Are Alive – 3:19
2. Seven Ways – 5:12
3. Forbidden Fruit – 6:16
4. Beautiful Place – 6:02
5. Another Way – 6:20
6. Tell Me Why – 5:48
  - Featuring Saint Etienne
7. Step Right On – 5:22
8. Words – 5:49
9. Together We Will Conquer – 7:17
10. A Magical Moment – 4:38
11. For an Angel – 7:17
12. Animacion – 7:14
13. My World – 3:50
