= STOLEN =

Chinese rock band

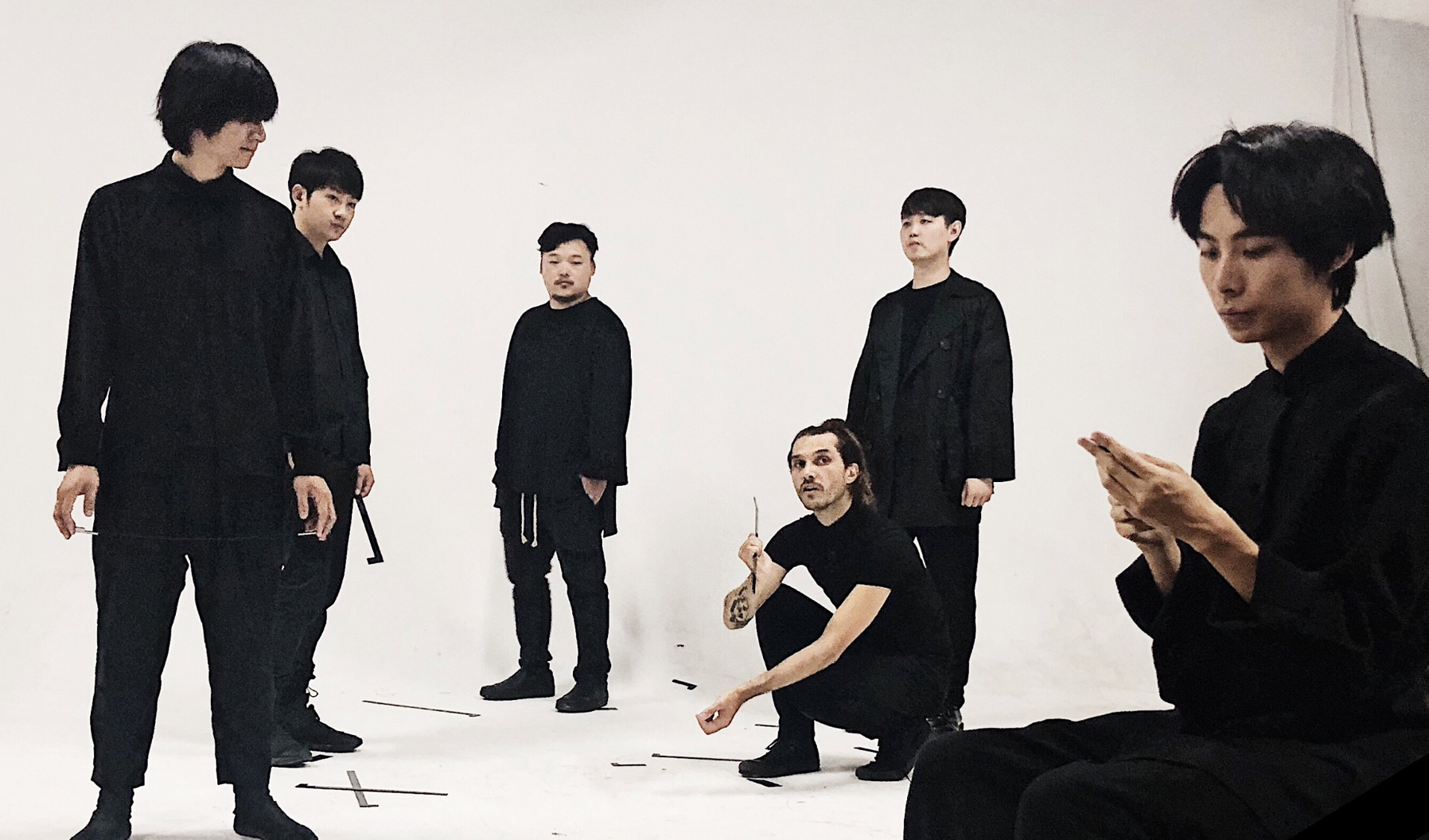

Background information
- Origin: Chengdu, China
- Genres: electronic music; alternative dance; techno-rock; post-punk; new wave
- Years active: 2009–present
- Labels: MFS, Caotai Music, UMAA
- Members: Liang Yi, FangDe, Duan Xuan, YuFeng, JunYang, Formol
- Website: STOLEN's Facebook; STOLEN's Instagram

STOLEN (Chinese: 秘密行动) are a Sinographic-Techno-Rock band from Chengdu, China. They were formed by vocalist Liang Yi, guitarist FangDe, bassist JunYang, drummer YuFeng, keyboardist Duan Xuan and a French VJ Formol.

== History ==
=== Origins ===
They were formed while studying at the Sichuan Conservatory of Music in 2009. During this time, they met Formol, a French VJ, who used to run a small bar close to the bands’ practice room. The band noticed the cool music being played in the bar every time they walked past. When STOLEN eventually played at Formol's bar, the band asked him to help them with their visuals, after that, he was invited to join the band in 2012. STOLEN became five Chinese musicians and a French VJ.
