= Time of Our Lives/Connected =

Single by Paul van Dyk featuring Vega 4

from the album Reflections
- Released: December 16, 2003
- Label: Vandit, Positiva, Mute

Paul van Dyk songs singles chronology
"Nothing but You" (2003)	"Time of Our Lives/Connected" (2003)	"Crush" (2004)

"Time of Our Lives/Connected" is a double A-side single written and released by Paul van Dyk. The (A) song "Time of Our Lives" was recorded in collaboration with the indie UK rock band Vega 4. "Time of Our Lives" was featured in a Jeep commercial in May, 2007 and in the film The Sisterhood of the Traveling Pants. The (AA) song "Connected" was featured in a Motorola commercial featuring Paul. This song also featured in the movie Into the Blue.

Paul van Dyk's single featuring Vega 4 is scheduled to be released on October 6, 2003 in Germany & UK, and September 23, 2003 in USA. PVD's album, Reflections featuring 'Time of Our Lives' is scheduled to be released on October 27, 2003 in Germany, October 20, 2003 in the UK, and October 7, 2003 in the USA.

== Track listing ==
=== CD Version ===
(Paul van Dyk's single featuring Vega 4 is scheduled to be released on October 6, 2003 in Germany & UK, and September 23, 2003 in USA. PVD's album, Reflections featuring 'Time of Our Lives' is scheduled to be released on October 27, 2003 in Germany, October 20, 2003 in the UK, and October 7, 2003 in the USA)

1. "Time of Our Lives" (Radio Edit) – 3:44
2. "Time of Our Lives" (PVD's Club Mix) – 7:50
3. "Connected" (Motomix 05) – 7:15
4. "Time of Our Lives" (Enhanced Video)

=== 12" Version ===
(Paul van Dyk's single featuring Vega 4 is scheduled to be released on October 6, 2003 in Germany & UK, and September 23, 2003 in USA. PVD's album, Reflections featuring 'Time of Our Lives' is scheduled to be released on October 27, 2003 in Germany, October 20, 2003 in the UK, and October 7, 2003 in the USA)

1. "Time of Our Lives" (PVD's Club Mix) [A] – 7:50
2. "Connected" (Motomix 05) [B1] – 7:15
3. "Connected" (Marco V Mix) [B1] – 8:46

=== CD: Mute / MUSDJ 155-2 (US) [2004] ===
1. "Time of Our Lives" (Pop Radio Mix) [The Swiss-American Federation Remix] – 3:32
2. "Time of Our Lives" (Dance Radio USA Mix) [PVD's Remix Edit] – 4:05

== Charts ==
Chart performance for "Time of Our Lives" / "Connected"
Chart (2003)	Peak position
Australia (ARIA)	100
Austria (Ö3 Austria Top 40)	47
Eurochart Hot 100 Singles	34
Germany (GfK)	14
Ireland (IRMA)	41
Netherlands (Single Top 100)	64
Switzerland (Schweizer Hitparade)	70
UK Singles (Official Charts)	28
UK Dance (Official Charts)	3
