= Crush (Paul van Dyk song) =

Single by Paul van Dyk featuring Second Sun

from the album Reflections
- Released: 25 March 2004
- Genre: Dance, trance
- Label: Vandit, Positiva
- Songwriter(s): Paul van Dyk, Adam Cavaluzi, Antoine Toupin

Paul van Dyk singles chronology
"Time of Our Lives/Connected" (2003)	"Crush" (2004)	"Wir Sind Wir" (2004)

"Crush" is a single released by Paul van Dyk in a collaboration with the trance duo, Second Sun.

== Track listing ==
=== CD Version ===
1. "Crush" (Extended Mix)
2. "Crush" (Original Mix)
3. "Crush" (Vandit Club Mix)
4. "Crush" (Hyper Remix)
5. "Crush" (Funk d'void Remix)
6. "Crush" (Video)

=== 12" Version ===
1. "Crush" (Vandit Club Mix)
2. "Crush" (PVD Original Mix)
3. "Crush" (PVD Remix)

== Charts ==
Chart performance for "Crush"
Chart (2004)	Peak position
Australia (ARIA)	91
Germany (GfK)	48
Netherlands (Single Top 100)	89
Spain (PROMUSICAE)	9
UK Singles (OCC)	42
