= Wir Sind Wir =

"Wir sind wir"

Single by Paul van Dyk featuring Peter Heppner
- Released: 28 June 2004
- Genre: Dance, Trance
- Label: Universal Music
- Songwriter(s): Paul van Dyk, Peter Heppner

Paul van Dyk singles chronology
| "Crush" (2004) | "Wir sind wir" (2004) | "The Other Side" (2005) |

"Wir sind wir (ein Deutschlandlied)" ("We Are We" (i.e. "We are who we are"), a Germany song) was released as a stand-alone single by Paul van Dyk in 2004. Unlike most of his other singles, this was not released on any official studio album by van Dyk. The song features Peter Heppner on vocals, and was only recorded in German, presumably because it speaks directly to Germans and Germany.

Are we the land of poets and thinkers, the land of the Wirtschaftswunder [economic wonder], the land of two world wars, the land which was divided and thereafter reunited?

"Wir sind wir" deals with the deep feeling of emotional insecurity that permeates the German society in the early 21st century. In 2004, Germany was in an economic slump, the controversial Hartz IV law had diminished the state welfare programs, and there was a lingering feeling of division between the one-time West German and East German provinces. The fact that Germany had turned itself from a one-time pariah into a valuable friend of the Western great powers (Britain, France, the United States) and had reunited itself with the end of the Cold War were suddenly unimportant. There was little pride in being German, and patriotism was a suppressed emotion.

This is reflected in the lyrics: despite having turned "ash into gold", people were feeling angst and fear of the future (40 Jahre zogen wir an einem Strang, aus Asche haben wir Gold gemacht/ (...) was vorher war ist heute nichts mehr wert). Heppner and Van Dyk then ask, where do the Germans stand, and answer "we are we, we are one, this is just a bad period, and we won't give up" (wir sind wir/ wieder eins in einem Land/ das ist doch nur ein schlechter Lauf/ so schnell geben wir doch jetzt nicht auf).

The song is a powerful statement for all Germans that they are neither bad nor good, but just themselves (we are we). For 40 years, everything went well, and now after some bad years, it is time to stand united and face the future together. The lyrics highlight the positive qualities of German culture and society and stand as a beacon of hope.

== Music video ==
The video shows Peter Heppner as an ageless camera man who films well-known images of German history:

- The destroyed Reichstag
- Bombed-out cities, a one-legged man limping on his crutches
- Trümmerfrauen (rubble women) salvaging scraps in a bombed-out post-World War II city
- The US "Raisin Bombers" dropping food into the starving West Berlin during the Berlin Airlift
- The soccer Miracle of Bern 1954, widely considered as a watershed moment for West Germany
- The building of the Berlin Wall, families crying as they were divided, the East German soldier Conrad Schumann jumping over barbed wire to defect into West Berlin (a timeless still image that captured the desperation of German Cold War division)
- The German Wirtschaftswunder, with new housings, cars and a new level of luxury
- The Oil Crisis
- The Fall of the Berlin Wall
- The rebuilt Reichstag in central Berlin

The video is a mix of new footage, and original footage where Heppner has been inserted by chroma key.

Paul van Dyk appears only twice, fleetingly on both occasions, initially reading a newspaper, and later in a bar.

== Track listing ==
=== CD Version ===
1. "Wir sind wir" (Radio Edit)
2. "Wir sind wir" (PvD Club Mix)
3. "Wir sind wir" (Dub Mix)
4. "Wir sind wir" (Video)

=== 12" Version ===
1. "Wir sind wir" (Club Mix)
2. "Wir sind wir" (Dub Mix)
3. "Wir sind wir" (Ambient Mix)

== Charts ==
=== Weekly charts ===
| Chart (2004) | Peak position |
|---|---|
| Austria (Ö3 Austria Top 40) | 75 |
| Germany (GfK) | 13 |

=== Year-end charts ===
| Chart (2004) | Position |
|---|---|
| Germany (Media Control GfK) | 49 |
