= Seven Ways =

Studio album by Paul van Dyk
- Released: November 25, 1996
- Genre: Trance, chill-out, house, techno, dance, electro
- Label: MFS (Germany); Deviant (UK); Mute (U.S.)
- Producer: Paul van Dyk; Jens Wojnar; Johnny Klimek

Paul van Dyk chronology
45 RPM (1994)	Seven Ways (1996)	Out There and Back (2000)

Singles from Seven Ways
- 1. "Beautiful Place" Released: 1996; 2. "Forbidden Fruit" Released: 1997; 3. "Words" Released: 1997

Professional ratings
Review scores
Source	Rating
AllMusic	4/5 stars
Muzik	5/5 stars
Spin	7/10

Seven Ways is the second studio album by Paul van Dyk, released on MFS in 1996 and later on Deviant Records and Mute Records. Several editions include a bonus disc featuring remixes of tracks from the main disc, as well as bonus tracks.

The album was voted #1 by the readers of DJ Magazine.

== Track listing ==
Disc 1
No.	Title	Length
1.	"Home" (vocals: Natascha van Dyk-Seidel)	6:52
2.	"Seven Ways"	6:24
3.	"Heaven" (vocals: Natascha van Dyk-Seidel)	5:29
4.	"I Like It" (vocals: Natascha van Dyk-Seidel)	5:42
5.	"Come (And Get It)"	6:20
6.	"Forbidden Fruit"	6:58
7.	"Beautiful Place" (vocals: Natascha van Dyk-Seidel)	7:01
8.	"People"	4:22
9.	"The Greatness of Britain"	8:38
10.	"I Can't Feel It"	8:00
11.	"Words" (vocals: Roland Ateundred)	9:39

Bonus Disc 1
No.	Title	Length
1.	"Seven Ways (Star Ways)"	5:54
2.	"Today (Trance Ambient Mix)"	5:36
3.	"Words (For Love)"	7:00
4.	"Beautiful Place (Paradise Mix)"	7:15
5.	"Forbidden Future"	9:19
6.	"Words (Mana Mix)"	6:21
7.	"Words (Curved Headcase Mix)"	5:00
8.	"Sundae 6 A.M."	10:54
9.	"Beautiful Place (Just Beautiful)"	7:00
10.	"Forbidden Fruit (BT's & PvD's Food Of Love Mix)"	9:41

Bonus Disc 2
No.	Title	Length
1.	"Seven Ways (Beyond The Veil Demo Mix)"	8:38
2.	"Don't Imitate, Innovate! (Ambient Dub)"	9:15
3.	"Spanish Lullaby (Paul van Dyk Remix)"	7:12
4.	"Come (Original Mix)"	6:58
5.	"Sundae 6 A.M."	10:54
6.	"Seven Ways (Star Ways)"	5:55
7.	"Don't Imitate, Innovate! (DJ Dub Mix)"	5:54
8.	"I Want You, I Need You (Demomix)"	6:11
9.	"Living For The Night (High-Waisted Flares)"	6:05
10.	"Beautiful Place (Salt Tank Remix)"	8:43
