= Music Rescues Me =

Studio album by Paul van Dyk
- Released: December 7, 2018
- Genre: Trance
- Label: Vandit
- Producer: Paul van Dyk

Paul van Dyk chronology
From Then On (2017)	Music Rescues Me (2018)	Guiding Light (2020)

Singles from Music Rescues Me
- 1. "Music Rescues Me" Released: 14 September 2018

Music Rescues Me is the ninth studio album by German DJ Paul van Dyk. It was released on 7 December 2018 through his label Vandit. The album features guest appearances from many artists, including Ronald van Gelderen, Alex M.O.R.P.H., Jordan Suckley, Pierre Pienaar, and Tristan D.

== Track listing ==
=== Digital download ===
Tracklist adapted from the iTunes Store.

Music Rescues Me
No.	Title	Writer(s)	Length
1.	"Amanecer"	Paul van Dyk and Lostly	7:48
2.	"You Are"	Paul van Dyk, Alan Wyse and Sue McLaren	8:32
3.	"Voyager"	Paul van Dyk and Alex M.O.R.P.H.	7:36
4.	"Echoes"	Paul van Dyk and James Cottle	6:57
5.	"Solar Snapshot"	Paul van Dyk and Chris Bekker	6:14
6.	"Music Rescues Me (PvD Club Mix)"	Paul van Dyk featuring Plumb	7:10
7.	"Aurora"	Paul van Dyk and Steve Dekay	5:52
8.	"Future Memories"	Paul van Dyk and Saad Ayub	5:22
9.	"Moments With You"	Paul van Dyk and Rafael Osmo	5:30
10.	"Lost Angels"	Paul van Dyk and Delta One	5:30
11.	"Accelerator"	Paul van Dyk and Jordan Suckley	7:23
12.	"Mission Control"	Paul van Dyk	7:21
13.	"Made of Stars"	Paul van Dyk and Project 8	6:40
14.	"Time Traveler"	Paul van Dyk	8:07
15.	"Reprise"	Paul van Dyk	4:45
