= Exense =

Norwegian software development company

Exense ASA
- Company type: Public
- Industry: Software
- Headquarters: Oslo, Norway
- Key people: Roar Aasvang (CEO); Sten Ihlebakke (chair)
- Number of employees: 70 (2008)
- Website: www.exense.com

Exense ASA is a Norwegian software developer that makes programs for managing procurement and logistics, in particular tailoring to the Scandinavian public health sector. Based in Oslo, it also has offices in Stockholm, Luleå and Lund in Sweden.

The company was listed on the Oslo Stock Exchange from 2000 to 2007, when it was degraded to Oslo Axess. In 2004, it bought the Swedish Idefix Konsult. The following year it bought Pro Consulting, but two years later it demerged the consulting division into Exense Consulting, that is also listed on Oslo Axcess. Another subsidiary Exense Software, with branches in Oslo, Stockholm and Lund, was almost sold to Visma on July 2, 2007, but the transaction was not completed.

In March 2009, the company's board was informed that Exense was insolvent. When the company was not able to pay the debt, the company requested an injunction on 3 March.
