= The Other Side (Paul van Dyk song) =

Single by Paul van Dyk featuring Wayne Jackson

from the album The Politics of Dancing 2
- Released: 23 August 2005
- Genre: Trance
- Length: 8:53 (Original mix); 3:54 (Radio edit)
- Label: Vandit; Mute (US); Positiva (UK)
- Songwriter(s): Paul van Dyk; Wayne Jackson
- Producer(s): Paul van Dyk

Paul van Dyk singles chronology
"Wir Sind Wir" (2004)	"The Other Side" (2005)	"White Lies" (2007)

"The Other Side" is a single released on Paul van Dyk's second DJ mix album The Politics of Dancing 2. Paul van Dyk wrote the song in retort to the devastating tsunami which hit southeast Asia on 26 December 2004. Van Dyk believes it is important to recognise that many thousands of people were affected by this tragedy, and lost loved ones. "The Other Side" portrays the feeling of still being with a person, in one's thoughts, who has died. It expresses the faith and aspiration of seeing that person again on "the other side".

The single also includes remixes by Deep Dish, Mark Spoon and Martin Roth. It features Wayne Jackson on vocals, formerly of the band the Dostoyevskys, and was also featured on Dance Dance Revolution SuperNOVA's home version songlist.

== Music video ==
The video features a poor elderly man going through a day in his life, with two ever-present people (invisible to him, possibly representing guardian angels, and played by Wayne and van Dyk) observing and occasionally influencing his life. The man goes out to beg with his dog, who finds a lottery ticket - and the man knows it's a winning ticket because he read the newspaper used to wrap food given to the dog by one of the guardian angels.

== Track listing ==
=== CD version ===
1. "The Other Side" (Radio Edit)
2. "The Other Side" (Original Mix)
3. "The Other Side" (Deep Dish Other Than This Side Remix)
4. "The Other Side" (Mark Spoon vs. Mobilegazer "Sundown Mix") *
5. "The Other Side" (Martin Roth Mix)
6. "The Other Side" (Breaks Mix) *
7. "The Other Side" (Mark Spoon vs. Mobilegazer "Sunrise Mix")

* (released only in the US version)

=== Vinyl A ===
1. "The Other Side" (Original Mix)
2. "The Other Side" (Martin Roth Mix)
3. "The Other Side" (Mark Spoon Mix)

=== Vinyl B ===
1. "The Other Side" (Deep Dish Mix)
2. "The Other Side" (Breaks Mix)

== Charts ==
Chart performance for "The Other Side"
Chart (2005)	Peak position
Australia (ARIA)	69
Finland (Suomen virallinen lista)	11
Germany (GfK)	29
Netherlands (Single Top 100)	40
UK Singles (OCC)	58
US Hot Dance Singles Sales	3
US Billboard Hot Dance Club Play	5
