= Wayne Jackson (singer) =

English singer

Wayne Jackson (born 23 June 1971, Manchester, England) is an English singer, songwriter and producer, who lives in Berlin.

== Biography ==
Born and raised in Manchester, Jackson now resides in Berlin. He studied English literature in Wales and has a degree. In addition to his interest in football (Manchester City F.C.) he has trained extensively in kick boxing, participating in the German national championships. He was the founder of the British band The Dostoyevskys who split up in the late 1990s. Before splitting, they were the support-act for Oasis on two of their tours. In 2005 Jackson co-wrote and appeared as featured vocalist and musician on Paul van Dyk's single "The Other Side".

Jackson produced the two solo albums of the German artist Bela B. (Bingo in 2006, Code B. in 2010). As a member of Bela B.'s live band Los Helmstedt, he played more than 60 shows. Jackson released his first solo album, The Long Goodbye in 2008. The second single "Shine On" was part of the summer campaign of the German TV channel RTL in 2008. The first single was called "Glorious" and was co-written with Paul Van Dyk. His second album, Undercover Psycho, was released in 2010 and entered the German Top 100 Album download charts at number 55. Influenced by New Order, U2, Editors or Snow Patrol, Jackson found his own unique and honest style. He wrote, recorded, produced and played nearly all the instruments for this second album on his own. Undercover Psycho includes the single "Hallelujah" which was the theme song of the movie Die Tür starring Mads Mikkelsen and Jessica Schwarz. Another song "I’m so Beautiful" was used as part of an RTL campaign in March 2010. The same year, Jackson released a cover version of the Lady Gaga hit "Bad Romance". The single reached the No. 1 position in the German radio stations "Radio Gong" and "Radio Berlin". The b-side of the digital-only released single includes the song "Undercover Psycho".

Besides his activities for Bela B. and his solo projects, he has also worked with the German singer Lula, who also lives in Berlin. These collaborations have covered her album Lost in Reverie, and further duets such as "Your Stars Never Shine" which can be found on Undercover Psycho.

Since releasing his solo material Jackson has performed live, both with a full band and alone. In August and September 2008, he did a club tour through Germany to present his album The Long Goodbye. He was supported by Lula. In February 2010, a second tour followed. The same year, Jackson played a number of festival dates, including the Deichbrand-Festival. The Open Flair and the Welt-Astra-Tag in Hamburg. He also supported the American band Train, Sivert Höyem and Philipp Poisel.

== Singles ==
Year	Title	Chart Positions			Album
Year	Title	Germany	Switzerland	Austria	Album
2005	"The Other Side" (with Paul van Dyk)	—	—	—	The Politics of Dancing 2
2008	"Glorious"	—	—	—	The Long Goodbye
2008	"Shine On"	—	—	—	The Long Goodbye
2009	"Hallelujah"	98	—	—	Undercover Psycho
2010	"Bad Romance"	—	—	—	non-album single

== Albums ==
Year	Title
2008	The Long Goodbye
2010	Undercover Psycho
