= Roland JX-1 =

- Manufacturer: Roland Corporation
- Dates: 1991-1992

Technical specifications
- Polyphony: 24 voices
- Velocity expression: yes
- Effects: reverb, chorus

Input/output
- Keyboard: 61 keys
- Left-hand control: Pitchbend / modulation lever
- External control: MIDI in/out/thru, pedal switch

The Roland JX-1 is a digital performance synthesizer manufactured by Roland Corporation. Released in 1991, the JX-1 is designed as an entry-level keyboard that emphasizes straightforward operation with a minimalistic control interface, suitable for beginners and performers who prefer a simple setup. This synthesizer was part of Roland's shift towards more accessible instruments during a period when synthesizers were becoming increasingly complex. The JX-1 features a distinctive design, including a 61-key velocity-sensitive keyboard without aftertouch and a physical layout that omits a display screen, focusing instead on direct control via buttons and sliders.

== Sounds and features ==
The JX-1 synthesizer offers a polyphony of 24 voices and includes basic digital sound generation technology with 64 preset tones and 32 memory slots for user-created or modified sounds. Its sound engine utilizes PCM samples with basic editing capabilities through four parameter sliders that adjust cutoff, resonance (termed “Color”), attack, and release. Additional sliders control overall volume and tonal brightness (“Brilliance”).

Roland equipped the JX-1 with practical performance features including pitch bend and modulation wheels, reverb and chorus effects, and a unique set of stereo inputs, allowing players to mix external audio sources with the internal sounds. This setup is intended for live performance scenarios where quick setup and broad sonic capability are needed. The interface promotes rapid sound changes and layering, where any two tones can be layered by pressing their buttons simultaneously.

Despite its streamlined design, the JX-1 provides expressive control over its sounds, suitable for both studio applications and live performances. The absence of a screen and the inclusion of direct physical controls cater to musicians who favor intuitive use over deep sound design exploration. The Roland JX-1 is characterized by its approach to balancing simplicity with functionality, reflecting early 1990s synthesizer design aimed at accessibility and ease of use.
