= From Then On =

Studio album by Paul van Dyk
- Released: 20 October 2017
- Genre: Trance
- Label: Vandit

Paul van Dyk chronology
The Politics of Dancing 3 (2015)	From Then On (2017)	Music Rescues Me (2018)

Singles from From Then On
- 1. "Everyone Needs Love" Released: 23 December 2016; 2. "Touched By Heaven" Released: 30 March 2017; 3. "Stronger Together" Released: 21 July 2017; 4. "I Am Alive" Released: 6 October 2017; 5. "Escape Reality Tonight" Released: 21 December 2017; 6. "Breaking Dawn" Released: 23 February 2018

From Then On is the eighth studio album by German DJ Paul van Dyk. It was released on 20 October 2017 through his label Vandit. The album features guest appearances from many artists, including Ronald van Gelderen, Alex M.O.R.P.H., Jordan Suckley, Pierre Pienaar, and Tristan D.

== Background ==
The album consists of 14 songs, including previously released singles "Touched by Heaven", "Everyone Needs Love" and "Stronger Together". Van Dyk spoke of the album, he said "This intensified experience of sights, sounds and sensations will be our next level of entertainment. Paired with music of my upcoming album From Then On, it’s going to be a celebration of trance, life and unity." Van Dyk's first since 2015, the album is a tribute to a crucial moment since 2016 when he went through a rehabilitation process after a near-fatal accident. The album was written by van Dyk when he was on tour, travelling.

== Track listing ==
=== Digital download ===
From Then On
No.	Title	Writer(s)	Length
1.	"While You Were Gone" (with Vincent Corver)	Paul van Dyk, Vincent Corver	5:20
2.	"Inhale" (with M.I.K.E. Push and Fred Baker)	van Dyk	6:40
3.	"Touched By Heaven"	van Dyk, Henry Nix, Matthias Gierth	7:29
4.	"I Am Alive"	van Dyk	4:38
5.	"Everyone Needs Love" (with Ronald van Gelderen featuring Gaelan and Eric Lumiere)	van Dyk, Ronald van Gelderen, Eric Lumiere, Niels van de Pavert	5:49
6.	"Breaking Dawn" (with Alex M.O.R.P.H.)	van Dyk	6:31
7.	"Vortex" (with James Cottle)	van Dyk	6:02
8.	"The Code" (with Jordan Suckley)	van Dyk	7:08
9.	"Stronger Together" (with Pierre Pienaar)	van Dyk, Pierre Pienaar	7:33
10.	"From Then On" (with Leroy Moreno)	van Dyk	6:39
11.	"Fairytales" (with Steve Allen)	van Dyk	6:15
12.	"Close Call" (with Tristan D)	van Dyk	7:21
13.	"Escape Reality Tonight" (with Emanuele Braveri featuring Rebecca Louise Burch)	van Dyk	7:42
14.	"Safe Haven"	van Dyk	7:31
Total length:			92:21

=== Vinyl ===
Side A
No.	Title	Writer(s)	Length
1.	"From Then On" (with Leroy Moreno)	van Dyk	6:39
2.	"I Am Alive"	van Dyk	4:38
3.	"Touched By Heaven"	van Dyk, Henry Nix, Matthias Gierth	7:29

Side B
No.	Title	Writer(s)	Length
4.	"Stronger Together" (with Pierre Pienaar)	van Dyk, Pierre Pienaar	7:33
5.	"Breaking Dawn" (with Alex M.O.R.P.H.)	van Dyk	6:31
6.	"Fairytales" (with Steve Allen)	van Dyk	6:15

== Charts ==
Chart (2017)	Peak position
Czech Albums (ČNS IFPI)	37
German Albums (Offizielle Top 100)	45
Swiss Albums (Schweizer Hitparade)	82
UK Dance Albums (OCC)	3
