= Nothing but You =

2003 single by Paul van Dyk

Single by Paul van Dyk featuring Hemstock & Jennings

from the album Reflections
- Released: 24 March 2003
- Length: 3:33
- Label: Vandit
- Songwriters: Paul van Dyk, Hemstock & Jennings
- Producer: Paul van Dyk

Paul van Dyk singles chronology
"We Are Alive" (2000)	"Nothing but You" (2003)	"Time of Our Lives/Connected" (2003)

"Nothing but You" is a single released by German DJ Paul van Dyk in association with British group Hemstock & Jennings, featuring trance singer Jan Johnston as well as Kym Marsh on vocals. "Nothing but You" is a re-work of Hemstock & Jennings' 2002 single "Arctic". Released in March 2003, the song reached number 14 on the UK Singles Chart, number six on the US Billboard Dance Club Play chart and number three on the Dutch Single Top 100.

The vocals featured in the track are Norwegian. The lyric "Jeg har ingenting, men jeg har alt når jeg har deg" translates to "I have nothing, but I have everything when I have you."

== Music video ==
The music video for "Nothing but You" is filmed in the style of the Reflections album. It includes images of the streets of Cape Town and follows a girl who climbs to the top of her apartment to the roof as a boy does the same on the other side of the street, interspersed with shots of Paul van Dyk in his apartment suite doing mundane activities and reflecting with a glum look on his face. At various points in the video, van Dyk looks up at the unnamed girl and thinks to himself, but in the end does nothing, whilst she connects with the boy on the opposite side. The girl and boy both climb down and they meet in the street where they inevitably kiss. The meaning behind this video probably reflects on the vocals of the song; while van Dyk has wealth and fame, he is still unhappy at the thought of being alone, whilst the girl and boy are happy despite not having anything but each other.

== Track listings ==
German and US 12-inch single

A1. "Nothing but You" (PVD club mix) – 8:25
B1. "Nothing but You" (Vandit club mix) – 7:14
B2. "Nothing but You" (Cirrus mix) – 6:30

German, US, and Australian CD single

1. "Nothing but You" (PVD radio mix) – 3:33
2. "Nothing but You" (Vandit radio mix) – 3:47
3. "Nothing but You" (PVD club mix) – 8:25
4. "Nothing but You" (Cirrus mix) – 6:30
5. "Nothing but You" (Vandit club mix) – 7:14
6. "Nothing but You" (Tomekk mix) – 8:13

UK CD1

1. "Nothing but You" (UK radio edit)
2. "Nothing but You" (Vandit club mix)
3. "La fiesta de la canicas"
4. Enhanced video section

UK CD2

1. "Nothing but You" (PVD club mix)
2. "Nothing but You" (Faithless remix)
3. "Nothing but You" (Cirrus mix)

UK 12-inch single

A1. "Nothing but You" (PVD club mix)
A2. "Nothing but You" (Cirrus mix 2)
AA1. "Nothing but You" (Faithless remix)

== Charts ==
=== Weekly charts ===
Chart (2003)	Peak position
Australia (ARIA)	83
Europe (Eurochart Hot 100)	27
Finland (Suomen virallinen lista)	16
Germany (GfK)	11
Hungary (Dance Top 40)	30
Ireland (IRMA)	34
Ireland Dance (IRMA)	2
Netherlands (Dutch Top 40)	15
Netherlands (Single Top 100)	3
Romania (Romanian Top 100)	100
Scottish Singles Sales (Official Charts)	10
Switzerland (Schweizer Hitparade)	76
UK Singles (Official Charts)	14
UK Dance (Official Charts)	1
US Dance Club Songs (Billboard)	6
US Dance Singles Sales (Billboard)	6
US Dance Airplay (Billboard)	10

=== Year-end charts ===
Chart (2003)	Position
Netherlands (Single Top 100)	74
US Dance Singles Sales (Billboard)	23

== Release history ==
Region	Date	Format(s)	Label(s)	Ref.
Germany	24 March 2003	12-inch vinyl	Vandit	
United States	22 April 2003	12-inch vinyl; CD	Mute	
Germany	19 May 2003	CD	Vandit	
United Kingdom	30 June 2003	12-inch vinyl; CD	Positiva	
