= You and Others =

Studio album by Vega4
- Released: 30 October 2006
- Genre: Rock, Indie rock
- Label: Sony BMG
- Producer: Jacknife Lee

Vega4 chronology
Satellites (2003)	You and Others (2006)

Professional ratings
Review scores
Source	Rating
AllMusic	3/5 stars

You and Others is the second album by British-based band, Vega4. It follows on five years after their debut album, Satellites. It was produced by former Compulsion guitarist Jacknife Lee, and released on 30 October 2006 on Sony BMG.

== Track listing ==
1. "You & Me" – 3:26
2. "Traffic Jam" – 4:20
3. "Tearing Me Apart" – 4:57
4. "Life Is Beautiful" – 6:15
5. "You" – 4:14
6. "Let Go" – 3:49
7. "Bullets" – 5:08
8. "Papercuts" – 4:30
9. "If This Is It" – 3:38
10. "A Billion Tons of Light" – 4:48
11. "Boomerang" – 4:23
