= Partyflock =

Partyflock is a Dutch virtual community for people interested in house music and other electronic dance music. Since 2001, Partyflock has evolved into the biggest online community for the dance scene in the Netherlands, with over 400 thousand members and 500 million page views a month.

== History ==
In 2001 Partyflock was started by Thomas van Gulick, then a student at the University of Twente. The University of Twente and Studenten Net Twente stimulated the growth of the site by allowing it to generate large amounts of web traffic as long as the site had no commercial goals. After Thomas’s graduation, Partyflock left the campus grounds and became an independent website.

Until March 2005 Partyflock was run entirely by volunteers. All computer hardware was paid for by member donations.

In February 2006 Partyflock counted 403,754 active members and on a monthly basis around one and a half million people visit the site. The site generates around 500 million page views per month.

In February 2007 Partyflock hosted a large indoor dance festival in the Gelredome in Arnhem to celebrate its fifth anniversary. Over 19,000 members attended "Flockers," as the festival was called.

Important elements of the website are the news section, a calendar with party dates for over 23,500 artists, 4,525 locations and 2,200 organizations; a photo section with over 400,000 party pictures, and an interactive forum on which a variety of topics are discussed that are of interest to Partyflock’s members. Subjects include music, new releases, parties, artists and clubs; and also sports, health, relationships and current affairs. Partyflock also has a sub-forum where English speaking members can post.
