= MFS (label) =

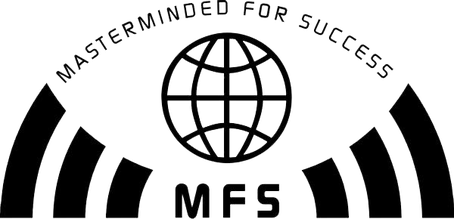
- Founded: 1990
- Founder: Mark Reeder
- Genre: Trance; techno; ambient; electronic rock
- Country of origin: Germany
- Location: Berlin, Germany
- Official website: MFS Official Facebook MFS Official Site

MFS (Masterminded For Success) is an independent electronic dance music label from Berlin, Germany. Founded by Mark Reeder in 1990, it initially ran until 2008, when Reeder put the label on ice to concentrate on his own music production and remixer career. Reeder reactivated the label in 2018, specifically to release the album Fragment by Chinese band STOLEN.

The label was originally founded by "Deutsche Schallplatten Berlin" the former GDR record company, which made it the very first independent dance music label of East Germany, until the DSB closed down in 1993. After which, Mark Reeder and his partner Torsten Jurk took MFS and carried on as a fully independent label, to launch the careers and release music by some of electronic dance music's seminal artists.

MFS is considered to be one of, if not the first trance label, as it was to be the first to coin the term "trance music", and today, is seen by few as a traditional underground label due to its commercial success. Its main focus from the beginning was trance music, but soon started to release a wide variety of different music within the electronic genres. MFS helped to start many now famous artists at the early stages of their careers such as, Paul van Dyk, Harald Blüchel (Cosmic Baby), Johnny Klimek, Ellen Allien, Dr. Motte, Mijk van Dijk, Humate (Gerret Frerichs, Oliver Huntemann), as well as many others.

== History ==
=== 1990s, MFS - Masterminded For Success ===
In December 1990, after the fall of the Berlin Wall, the communist state-owned ex-Amiga record label aka Deutschen Schallplatten Berlin (DSB) followed Mark Reeder's suggestion in founding an electronic music record label "Masterminded For Success". Reeder had already built up a working relationship with the AMIGA/DSB, during the recording of the album "Torture" for East German indie band, Die Vision in East Berlin while the Berlin Wall was still up. The name "MFS" was actually taken from the initials of Ministry for State Security(German: Ministerium für Staatssicherheit, MfS), commonly known as the Stasi in East Germany. The label was originally started by Reeder and the distribution was run by Mirko Withfield. Reeder brought in Torsten Jurk and Matt Graver, who shortly after left the label to become the manager of Atari Teenage Riot. After the collapse of DSB and the sale to BMG in the late 1993, Reeder and Jurk secured all the rights on the label name and catalogue, which had originally been funded by the DSB.

The first artist to be signed on the label was Rocky, followed by VOOV, Paul Browse, and Johnny Klimek known as "Effective Force" and Gaby Delgado from DAF and Saba Komossa's "2 German Latinos", and "Neutron 9000". MFS soon started to gain a "trance" profile and in early 1991 soon signed Mijk van Dijk, Cosmic Baby, Humate and Paul van Dyk. Reeder's vision to create a melodic, uplifting and positive sounding version of Techno was eventually to be realised by Cosmic Baby. One of the most known projects under MFS was, "The Visions of Shiva", a collaboration by Cosmic Baby (Harald Blüchel) & Paul van Dyk. Together they released, "Perfect Day" & "How Much Can You Take?" before going their separate ways in 1993. Another one of MFS more well-known releases was "Love Stimulation" by Humate in 1993, along with a remix by Paul van Dyk.

Taken from the previous years releases, MFS released the first ever Trance compilation in 1992 called, Tranceformed From Beyond which became a milestone and set the standard for others to come. The album was sequenced and mixed by Cosmic Baby & Mijk van Dijk. A year later, MFS asked Paul van Dyk to make a mix for their second compilation album, a soundtrack for an early computer graphic video which they called "X-Mix 1 - The MFS Trip" this was a collaboration with the video label K7!.

Some of the more well-known albums from MFS were, "Stellar Supreme"(1992), "Ki"(1993) by 030/Dr Motte, "Afreuropamericasiaustralica"(1994) by Mijk van Dijk and Paul van Dyk's "45 RPM"(1994) and "Seven Ways"(1996) albums. Both PVD & Cosmic Baby became MFS main artists, but in 1994 Cosmic Baby left the label, allured by promises of stardom from the major record company BMG.

Reeder started signing more underground artists and tracks, while Jurk focused on Paul van Dyk artist development and implementing a booking agency and publishing into the label work. During the mid-late 1990s, Paul van Dyk would later become a huge commercial success for MFS. He released his first two albums and stayed with MFS up until 1997, when Reeder and Jurk parted away.

Reeder who continued the label later faced a lawsuit with Paul van Dyk over his third studio album, which turned out to be "Out There and Back" which was eventually released on Rob Deacon's Deviant Records UK.

=== 2000s, Discontinuation ===
After 1999, the dance scene was starting shift into a new direction, most importantly trance was as well.

MFS later had trouble releasing other kinds of records other than trance and because of the change and rise of many trance labels at the end of the 20th century. Reeder decided he wanted to distance himself from trance and focus more on other genres, mainly techno and a new deeper, sexier sound he had devised and created with Corvin Dalek, which he called Wet & Hard. In 1999, MFS created two sub-labels called, "Flesh" and "Telemetric". The focus on the "Flesh" label was Wet & Hard and "Telemetric" was mainly techno, including some deeper trance releases.

The "Telemetric" label was very short lived (after the suspicious murder of the labels A&R Carlos Heinz in late 2001) and therefore never reached commercial success.

Label "Flesh" however, went on to release tracks by artists like Corvin Dalek (who Reeder worked together on many remixes with for artists such as New Order, Destiny's Child, Da Hool, or Faithless), "Mr Sam", "Eiven Major", "Klang" and "Jan Kessler". "Flesh" records are rare and most sought after these days and are recognised through their distinctive "HotKunst" (hot art) artwork style which Reeder and Dalek created and which frequently caused controversy, one CD Assorted Lovetoys was even banned in Switzerland.

The "Flesh" label released some classic club tracks, such as "Young People", "Pounds & Penz", "Pornoground", "Crystal" or "I Like It 69", culminating in a series of "Flesh" Wet&Hard compilations ("Wet&Hard", "Flesh For Fantasy" or "Feel") and Corvin Dalek's album I Am A Dalek. With this album, Mark travelled the world together with Corvin Dalek, from Colombia to China, US, Mexico and UK and almost everywhere in between.

Sadly, due to the demise of many of the main European vinyl distributors in 2000, label owner Reeder decided to put MFS and his sub-labels on ice and ceased all label activity in 2008. He wanted to return to making and producing electronic-rock music again.

=== 2018, Reactivated ===
After releasing two albums FivePointOne (2011) and Mauerstadt (2017), Reeder's reworks with Blank & Jones for Reordered (2008) as well as numerous remixes for bands like New Order, Depeche Mode and the Pet Shop Boys. In the Spring of 2017, Reeder undertook a two-month tour of China with his documentary film "B-Movie: Lust & Sound in West-Berlin", a movie made up of original 80's footage, about his early life in the walled-in city. During this tour, he was introduced to STOLEN, a young Psychedelic-Techno-Rock band from Chengdu. Impressed, they recorded a demo together and the band decided they would like Reeder to produce their second album. STOLEN then embarked on a 32-week tour of China to acquire enough funds for their stay in Berlin.

Together with Reeder and his studio partner Micha Adam, STOLEN recorded the album FRAGMENT in 2018. It was after this recording session, Reeder decided to reactivate MFS, especially for the release of this album.

Reeder originally starting MFS as a label platform for new and enthusiastic Eastern European artists, he had now moved his search for interesting artists in the Far East.

== Discography ==
catalogue #  format  artist                                          medium title

7001-0       12"     Rocky One                                       Take You Back
7001-3       CD-M    Rocky One                                       Take You Back
7002-0       12"     VOOV                                            User
7002-3       CD-M    VOOV                                            User
7003-0       12"     Effective Force                                 Diamond Bullet
7003-3       CD-M    Effective Force                                 Diamond Bullet
7004-0       12"     Gundi B                                         Yeah!
7004-3       CD-M    Gundi B                                         Yeah!
7005-0       12"     General Motor                                   I'm gonna give you my Love
7005-3       CD-M    General Motor                                   I'm gonna give you my Love
7006-0       12"     2 German Latinos                                Viva la Droga Electronica 
7006-3       CD-M    2 German Latinos                                Viva la Droga Electronica 
7007-0       12"     Alien Nation                                    Lovers of the World
7007-0R      12"     Alien Nation                                    Lovers of the World Remix
7007-3       CD-M    Alien Nation                                    Lovers of the World 
7008-0       12"     True Love                                       Breath of Stars
7008-3       CD-M    True Love                                       Breath of Stars
7009-0       12"     Frisco Sisco                                    Fast Forward
7009-3       CD-M    Frisco Sisco                                    Fast Forward
7010-0       12"     Neutron 9000                                    Ki Oha Girl
7010-3       CD-M    Neutron 9000                                    Ki Oha Girl
7011-0       12"     Effective Force                                 Complete Mental Breakdown
7011-3       CD-M    Effective Force                                 Complete Mental Breakdown
7012-0       12"     Sungods                                         Ascension
7012-3       CD-M    Sungods                                         Ascension
7013-3       CD-M    Delkom                                          All from Anti-time
7014-0       12"     Cosmic Baby                                     Transcendental Overdrive EP
7014-3       CD-M    Cosmic Baby                                     Transcendental Overdrive EP
7015-0       12"     Neutron 9000 vs The Mysteries of Science        Tranceplant
7015-3       CD-M    Neutron 9000 vs The Mysteries of Science        Tranceplant
7016-0       12"     VOOV                                            GAS
7016-3       CD-M    VOOV                                            GAS
7017-0       12"     Futurhythm                                      Sonic Mind Explosion
7018-0       12"     Mindgear                                        Don't Panic
7018-3       CD-M    Mindgear                                        Don't Panic
7019-0       12"     Microglobe                                      High on Hope
7019-3       CD-M    Microglobe                                      High on Hope
7020-0       12"     Cosmic Baby GTO Remixes                         Cosmic Babies
7021-1       LP      MFS Compilation                                 Tranceformed From Beyond
7021-2       CD      MFS Compilation                                 Tranceformed From Beyond
7022-0       12"     The Visions of Shiva                            Perfect Day
7022-3       CD-M    The Visions of Shiva                            Perfect Day
7023-1       12"EP   Cosmic Baby                                     23
7023-2       CD-EP   Cosmic Baby                                     23
7024-0       12"     God's Brain                                     Virtual Love
7024-3       CD-M    God's Brain                                     Virtual Love
7025-1       12"EP   Microglobe                                      High on Hope (The Summer Remixes)
7025-2       CD-EP   Microglobe                                      High on Hope (The Summer Remixes)
7026-1       12"EP   United Frequencies of Trance                    Vol. 1
7026-2       CD-EP   United Frequencies of Trance                    Vol. 1
7027-1       12"EP   United Frequencies of Trance                    Vol. 2
7027-2       CD-EP   United Frequencies of Trance                    Vol. 2
7028-0       12"     Volumina                                        Alright
7028-3       CD-M    Volumina                                        Alright
7029-0       12"     Humate                                          Chrome (So what!)
7029-3       CD-M    Humate                                          Chrome (So what!)
7030-1       LP      The Nights of Pan                               Into The Great White Light
7030-2       CD      The Nights of Pan                               Into The Great White Light
7031-1       12"EP   United Frequencies of                           Vol. 3
7031-2       CD-EP   United Frequencies of                           Vol. 3
7032-1       12"EP   United Frequencies of                           Vol. 4
7032-2       CD-EP   United Frequencies of                           Vol. 4
7033-1       LP      Cosmic Baby                                     Stellar Supreme
7033-2       CD      Cosmic Baby                                     Stellar Supreme
7034-0       12"     Humate                                          Love Stimulation
7034-3       CD-M    Humate                                          Love Stimulation
7035-2       CD      VOOV                                            Deutschfieber
7036-0       12"     Boom Operators                                  LSA
7036-3       CD-M    Boom Operators                                  LSA
7037-0       12"     Loopzone                                        Home Is Where The ...
7037-3       CD-M    Loopzone                                        Home Is Where The ...
7038-1       LP      Effective Force                                 Illuminate The Planet
7038-2       CD      Effective Force                                 Illuminate The Planet
7040-1       12"EP   Malaria                                         Delirium
7040-2       CD      Malaria                                         Delirium
7041-0       12"     Cosmic Baby                                     Heavens Tears
7041-3       CD-M    Cosmic Baby                                     Heavens Tears
7042-0       12"     The Visions Of Shiva                            How Much Can You Take
7042-3       CD-M    The Visions Of Shiva                            How Much Can You Take
7043-0       12"     Loopzone                                        404
7043-3       CD-M    Loopzone                                        404
7044-0       12"     Effective Force                                 Illuminate The Planet
7044-3       CD-M    Effective Force                                 Illuminate The Planet
7045-1       LP      Various MFS Artists                             X-Mix 1 The MFS-Trip
7045-2       CD      Various MFS Artists                             X-Mix 1 The MFS-Trip
7045-4       Cass    Various MFS Artists                             X-Mix 1 The MFS-Trip
7046-1       LP      030 feat. Dr. Motte                             Ki
7046-2       CD      030 feat. Dr. Motte                             Ki
7047-0       12"     Secret Knowledge                                Sugar Daddy
7048-0       12"     Secret Knowledge                                Sugar Daddy Remix
7048-3       CD-M    Secret Knowledge                                Sugar Daddy Remix
7049-0       12"     Sarin International                             Kontrol
7050-0       12"     Microglobe                                      Think & Dance EP-Vol.1
7050-3       CD-M    Microglobe                                      Think & Dance EP-Vol. 1
7051-0       12"     Cal-Q-Lator                                     Dr. Bradford
7051-3       CD-M    Cal-Q-Lator                                     Dr. Bradford
7052-0       12"     Paul van Dyk                                    The Green Valley E.P.
7052-3       CD-M    Paul van Dyk                                    The Green Valley E.P.
7053-0       12"     Mystic Force vs. Effective Force                Everglade
7053-3       CD-M    Mystic Force vs. Effective Force                Everglade
7054-0       12"     Positive Thinking                               Infinite
7054-3       CD-M    Positive Thinking                               Infinite
7055-1       Do-LP   Microglobe                                      Afreuropamericasiaustralica
7055-2       CD      Microglobe                                      Afreuropamericasiaustralica
7056-0       12"     Paul van Dyk                                    Pumpin'
7056-3       CD-M    Paul van Dyk                                    Pumpin'
7057-0       12"     Microglobe                                      Think & Dance EP-Vol. 2
7057-3       CD-M    Microglobe                                      Think & Dance EP-Vol. 2
7058-0       12"     Project Earth                                   Tak Ze
7058-3       CD-M    Project Earth                                   Tak Ze
7059-0       12"     VOOV                                            Extra Power & Enjoyment
7059-3       CD-M    VOOV                                            Extra Power & Enjoyment
7060-0       12"     Mystic Force                                    Psychic Harmony
7060-3       CD-M    Mystic Force                                    Psychic Harmony
7062-0       12"     Paul van Dyk                                    Emergency
7062-3       CD-M    Paul van Dyk                                    Emergency
7063-0       12"     Commander Krilly                                Deep
7063-3       CD-M    Commander Krilly                                Deep
7064-0       12"     Joe T. Vanelli feat. Csilla                     Voices In Harmony
7064-3       CD-M    Joe T. Vanelli feat. Csilla                     Voices In Harmony
7065-0       12"     Effective Force                                 My Time Is Yours
7065-3       CD-M    Effective Force                                 My Time Is Yours
7066-1       Do-LP   Paul van Dyk                                    45 RPM
7066-2       CD      Paul van Dyk                                    45 RPM
7067-0       12"     Positive Thinking                               Hots For You
7067-3       CD-M    Positive Thinking                               Hots For You
7068-0       12"     VOOV                                            Grau 1
7068-3       CD-M    VOOV                                            Grau 1
7069-1       Do-LP   Mystic Force                                    Frontier
7069-2       CD      Mystic Force                                    Frontier
7071-0       12"     Cal-Q-Lator                                     Wash Malfunction
7071-3       CD-M    Cal-Q-Lator                                     Wash Malfunction
7072-0       12"     Microglobe                                      The Afreuroparemixes Vol. 1-A Different View
7073-0       12"     Jay Ray                                         Activated
7073-3       CD-M    Jay Ray                                         Activated
7074-0       12"     Ellen Allien                                    Yellow Sky 
7074-3       CD-M    Ellen Allien                                    Yellow Sky 
7075-0       12"     DFM                                             You Like That?
7075-3       CD-M    DFM                                             You Like That?
7076-0       12"     Positive Thinking                               The Temple And The Lodge
7076-3       CD-M    Positive Thinking                               The Temple And The Lodge
7077-0       12"     Effective Force                                 Left Hand, Right Hand
7077-3       CD-M    Effective Force                                 Left Hand, Right Hand
7078-0       12"     Microglobe                                      Afreuroparemixes Vol. 2
7079-2       CD      Microglobe                                      Afreuroparemixes
7080-2       CD      Various MFS Artists                             Club European (Compilation)
7080-4       Cass    Various MFS Artists                             Club European
7081-0       12"     Marco Zaffarano                                 Pandora's Box
7081-3       CD-M    Marco Zaffarano                                 Pandora's Box
7082-1       Do-LP   Effective Force                                 Back and to the Left
7082-2       CD      Effective Force                                 Back and to the Left
7083-0       12"     Commander Krilly                                Raptures Of The Deep
7083-3       CD-M    Commander Krilly                                Raptures Of The Deep
7084-0       12"     Denki Groove (Takkyu Ishino)                    Niji - The MFS Remixes
7084-3       CD-M    Denki Groove (Takkyu Ishino)                    Niji - The MFS Remixes
7085-0       12"     Jay Ray                                         Nightvisions
7085-3       CD-M    Jay Ray                                         Nightvisions
7086-0       12"     Cybersecrecy                                    The First Experience
7086-3       CD-M    Cybersecrecy                                    The First Experience
7087-0       12"     Paul van Dyk                                    Beautiful Place
7087-3       CD-M    Paul van Dyk                                    Beautiful Place
7088-1       Do-LP   Paul van Dyk                                    Seven Ways
7088-2       CD      Paul van Dyk                                    Seven Ways
7089-0       12"     Cybersecrecy                                    Infinite Senses
7089-3       CD-M    Cybersecrecy                                    Infinite Senses
7090-0       12"     Tenth Chapter                                   Wired
7090-3       CD-M    Tenth Chapter                                   Wired
7091-1       Do-LP   Cal-Q-Lator                                     Cal-Pillin
7091-2       CD      Cal-Q-Lator                                     Cal-Pillin
7092-0       12"     Current                                         Tide / Plankton
7092-3       CD-M    Current                                         Tide / Plankton
7093-0       12"     Cle presents Klubland???                        Klub Berlin
7093-3       CD-M    Cle presents Klubland                           Klub Berlin
7094-0       12"     JonZon                                          TBA
7094-3       CD-M    JonZon                                          TBA
7095-0       12"     DFM                                             Gonna Be Mine
7095-3       CD-M    DFM                                             Gonna Be Mine
7096-0       12"     Marco Zaffarano                                 Clown Confusion
7096-3       CD-M    Marco Zaffarano                                 Clown Confusion
7097-2       CD      Marco Zaffarano                                 He was once a beautiful woman
7098-0       12"     Denki Groove                                    Niji - Twilight Remixes
7098-3       CD-M    Denki Groove                                    Niji - Twilight Remixes
7099-0       12"     Ten Forward                                     Patterns Of Force
7099-3       CD-M    Ten Forward                                     Patterns Of Force
7100-1       Do-LP   Various MFS Artists                             The 100 Compilation
7100-2       CD      Various MFS Artists                             The 100 Compilation
7101-0       12"     Cal-Q-Lator                                     Can We Go Now ?
7102-0       12"     Drop Out                                        Image
7103-1       Do-LP   Jay Ray                                         November
7103-2       CD      Jay Ray                                         November
7104-2       CD      Sub-D                                           Exaspirin
7105-0       12"     Jay Ray                                         Daylight
7105-3       CD-M    Jay Ray                                         Daylight
7106-0       12"     Paul van Dyk                                    Forbidden Fruit
7106-3       CD-M    Paul van Dyk                                    Forbidden Fruit - Part 1
7109-0       12"     Angelo                                          Funkdamental
7110-0       12"     Sunday Club                                     Healing Dream
7111-0       12"     Lucky Monkeys                                   Bjango
7112-2       CD      Various Artists                                 Assorted
7113-0       12"     Joshua                                          Soul Fly
7114-0       12"     Marco Zaffarano                                 The Band
7114-3       CD-M    Marco Zaffarano                                 The Band
7115-0       12"     Paul van Dyk                                    Words Part I
7115-3       CD-M    Paul van Dyk                                    Words Part I
7116-2       Do-CD   Paul van Dyk                                    Perspective
7117-0       12"     Jay Ray                                         Arctic Survival Remixes
7117-3       CD-M    Jay Ray                                         Arctic Survival Remixes
7118-2       CD      Assorted 2                                      E for Europe
7118-7       MD      Assorted 2                                      E for Europe
7119-0       12"     Cybersecrecy                                    Polygraph
7120-1       Do-LP   Cybersecrecy                                    Cyberwelt
7120-2       CD      Cybersecrecy                                    Cyberwelt
7122-6       12"     Chris Zippel                                    Riders of the Storm
7125-6       12"     Cybersecrecy                                    E for Europe
7126-1       Do-LP   Marco Zaffarano                                 Minimalism
7126-2       Do-CD   Marco Zaffarano                                 Minimalism
7127-0       12"     Marco Zaffarano                                 Screamer
7128-0       12"     Ashtrax                                         Kafka
7129-0       12"     Curve                                           Chinese Burn
7130-6       12"     Marco Zaffarano                                 Burnt
7132-6       12"     Arrakis                                         Aira Force
7133-6       12"     Corvin Dalek                                    Pounds&Penz
7134-6       12"     Namito                                          Lotus
7135-6       12"     Marmion                                         Best Regards
7137-0       12"     Jay Ray                                         Sure Shot
7138-6       12"     Blue Amazon                                     No other Love
7140-6       12"     Cabala                                          Dark Blue
7141-1       Do-LP   Ohm Square                                      Ohmophonica
7141-2       CD      Ohm Square                                      Ohmophonica
7142-0       12"     Ohm Square                                      Pillow
7142-3       CD-M    Ohm Square                                      Pillow
7144-6       12"     Jonny Riko                                      Starship Trooper
7146-6       12"     Denki Groove                                    Niji Rainbow Rmx
7147-6       12"     Dillinger & Capone                              Stendahl Syndrome
7150-2       CD      Assorted 3                                      Stadtansichten
9050-0       12"     Microglobe                                      Think & Dance EP-Vol.1
9052-0       12"     Paul van Dyk                                    The Green Valley E.P.
9066-1       10"     Paul van Dyk                                    45 Remixes Per Miunute
9066-2       Do-CD   Paul van Dyk                                    45 RPM
9069-2       Do-CD   Mystic Force                                    Frontier
9082-2       Do-CD   Effective Force                                 Back and to the Left
9088-2       Do-CD   Paul van Dyk                                    Seven Ways
9103-2       Do-CD   Jay Ray                                         November
9106-3       CD-M    Paul van Dyk                                    Forbidden Fruit - Part 2
9114-0       12"     Marco Zaffarano                                 The Band UK Import
9115-0       12"     Paul van Dyk                                    Words Part II
9115-3       CD-M    Paul van Dyk                                    Words Part II
9180-0       10"     Mijk van Dijk / Positive Thinking               European Compilation
9280-0       10"     Paul van Dyk / Cal-Q-Lator                      European Compilation
9380-0       10"     Mystic Force / Effective Force / Project Earth  European Compilation
9480-0       10"     Marco Zaffarano / Jay Ray                       European Compilation
9580-0       10"     Ellen Allien / Cybersecrecy                     European Compilation
9680-0       10"     Commander Krilly / VOOV                         European Compilation
1001-9       Poster  MFS                                             Wir sind zurück
1002-9       Poster  Cosmic Baby                                     Stellar Supreme
1003-9       Poster  Microglobe                                      Afreuropamericasia
1004-9       Poster  Paul van Dyk                                    Seven Ways
1005-9       Poster  Jay Ray                                         November
1006-9       Poster  Marco Zaffarano                                 He was once a beautiful woman
1007-9       Poster  MFS                                             European Tour
2094-3       CD-M    Paul van Dyk                                    For an Angel
2400-0       12"     Humate                                          Love Stimulation
2400-3       CD-M    Humate                                          Love Stimulation
33DJ         4x12"   Paul van Dyk                                    Vorsprung Dyk Technik
33TCD        3CD     Paul van Dyk                                    Vorsprung Dyk Technik

== See also ==
- List of record labels
