= Las Salinas =

- Location within the Dominican Republic
- Coordinates: 18°16′12″N 71°19′12″W
- Country: Dominican Republic
- Province: Barahona

Area
  - Total: 123.47 km^{2} (47.67 sq mi)

Population (2012)
  - Total: 5,956
  - Density: 48.24/km^{2} (124.9/sq mi)

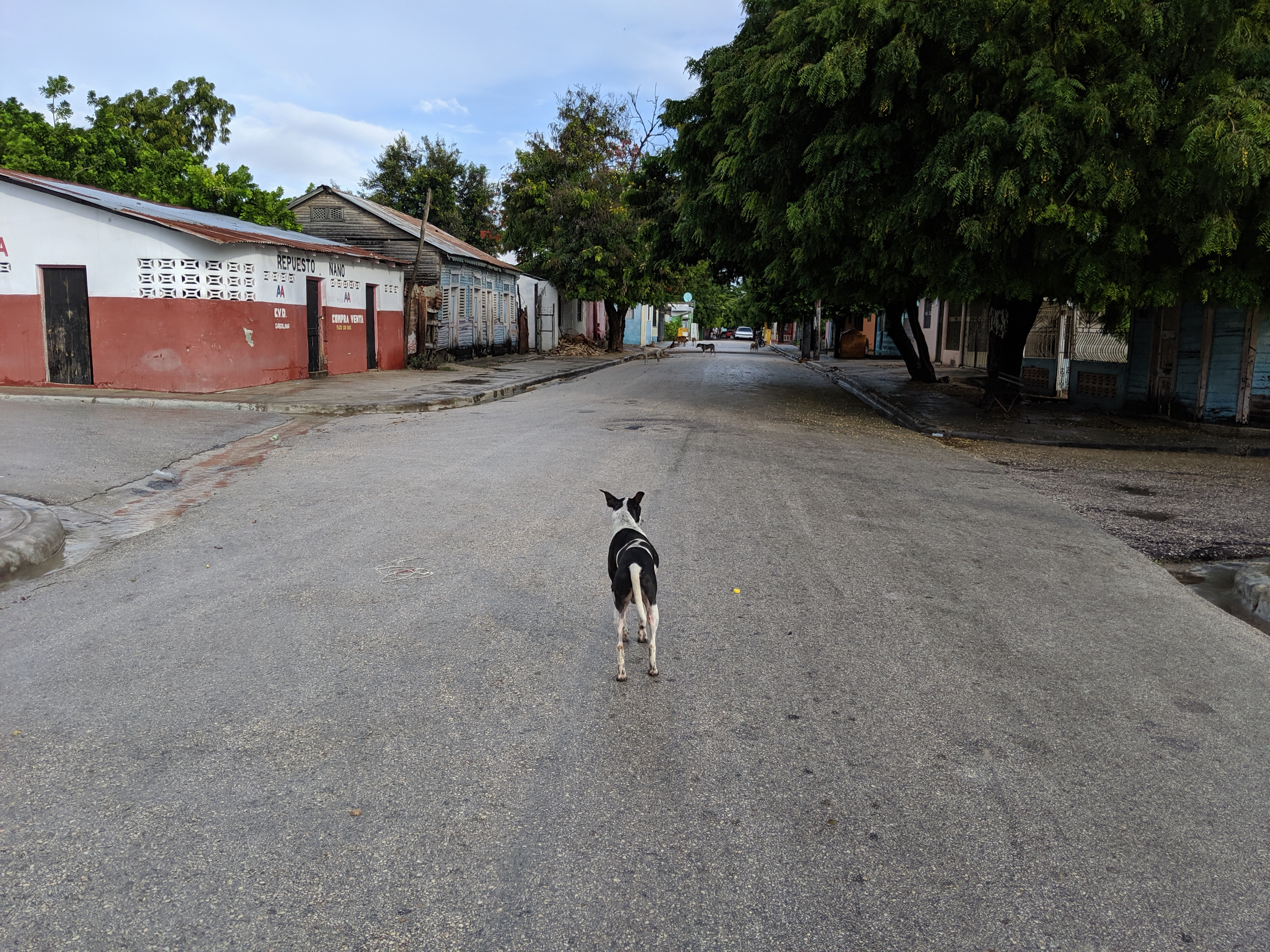
A street in Las Salinas.

Las Salinas is a town in the Barahona province of the Dominican Republic. Originally, Las Salinas was a salt mining town, which is how it got its name, from Spanish salina 'salt mine'.

== Culture ==
Nightlife, music, and dancing are key components to Dominican culture, and is popular in Las Salinas. Dembow, Bachata, Merengue, and Reggaeton are popular nightlife spots.

Many people enjoy riding motorcycles and doing tricks on the street. The most popular sports are volleyball, basketball, and baseball.

== Cuisine ==
Las Salinas has many unique dishes. Dishes tend to have plantains either in the form of tostones or mangú. Other popular dishes usually have one of the following: avena (oatmeal), spaghetti, fried eggs, and Dominican salami.

== Güevedoces ==
Las Salinas is notable for having a number of cases in the village with a rare 5-alpha-reductase deficiency. Although having a Y-chromosome and male internal organs, at birth they tend to appear externally female and are raised as girls. Around puberty, the onset of male hormones causes virilization and their actual sex becomes apparent. At this point, they switch genders and are raised as boys. This is a common enough occurrence that it does not cause much concern among the townspeople, who are accustomed to it. These boys are called "güevedoces" from a combined slang form meaning "eggs (testes) at twelve".
