= Vega4 =

English alternative rock band (1999–2008)

- Origin: London, England
- Genres: Rock, alternative rock, Britpop
- Years active: 1999–2008
- Labels: Sony, Universal, Taste
- Past members: Johnny McDaid; Bryan McLellan; Bruce Gainsford; Gavin Fox; Simon Walker

Vega4 was a four-piece alternative rock band formed in London consisted of Johnny McDaid (lead vocalist and songwriter), Bruce Gainsford (guitar), Gavin Fox (bassist) and Bryan McLellan (drummer).

McDaid is from Northern Ireland and Fox is from Republic of Ireland, McLellan is from Canada and Gainsford is from New Zealand. Vega4 was signed to Columbia Records in the UK, Epic Records in the US, and produced two albums, You and Others produced by Jacknife Lee and "Satellites" produced by John Cornfield and Ron Aniello.

The band disbanded in 2008.

== History ==
McDaid and Walker formed Vega4 in 1999, adding Gainsford and McLellan through mutual friends. The band signed with indie label Taste Media in 2000, setting up distribution deals with Capitol Records in the U.S. and Festival Mushroom in Australia for their 2001 debut EP, Caterpillar, and the follow-up album, Satellites. Despite heavy touring and promotion, the album was not a success, and Vega4 went into a period of dormancy while extricating themselves from their various contracts.

Vega 4 was also featured on Paul Van Dyk's song "Time of Our Lives/Connected" in 2003.

In 2006, Walker left Vega 4 while former Idlewild bassist Gavin Fox joined. Vega4 signed with Columbia Records in the U.K. and Epic Records in the U.S., which promoted the single "You and Me" somewhat disingenuously as the band's debut. The following single, "Life Is Beautiful," gained exposure through its use in episodes of the TV series Grey's Anatomy and One Tree Hill. It is also included in the 2010 film Streetdance, and previously in 2008's comedy film, Sex Drive. The band received much media attention in the US, with major radio support for "Life Is Beautiful" and the rumours of Gainsford's on-again, off-again romance with Scarlett Johansson.

Vega4's second album, You and Others, was released in late 2006 in the U.K. and mid 2007 in the U.S. Vega4's song "You and Me" was used by RTÉ 2FM to launch the station's new look and lineup. The band completed its first US tour in April 2007 in San Diego, California. Vega4 had been touring with Augustana for the previous several weeks. The band played at the 2007 SXSW festival.

== Discography ==
=== Albums ===
- Satellites (2002)
- You and Others (2006)

=== EPs ===
- Caterpillar (demo, 2000)
- Better Life (2001)
- Drifting Away Violently (2002)

=== Singles ===
- "Sing" (2001)
- "Radio Song" (2001)
- "Love Breaks Down" (2002)
- "Drifting Away Violently" (2002)
- "Better Life" (2002)
- "Time of Our Lives", with Paul van Dyk (2003)
- "You & Me" (2006)
- "Traffic Jam" (2006)
- "Life Is Beautiful" (2006)
