= The Politics of Dancing (Paul van Dyk album) =

Compilation album by Paul van Dyk
- Released: October 2001
- Genre: Trance
- Label: Ministry of Sound
- Producer: Paul van Dyk

Paul van Dyk chronology
Out There and Back (2000)	The Politics of Dancing (2001)	Global (2003)

Professional ratings
Review scores
Source	Rating
AllMusic	4.5/5 stars
Resident Advisor	5/5 stars
Rolling Stone	Favorable

The Politics of Dancing is a compilation mix album of trance music mixed by Paul van Dyk and released by Ministry of Sound and its Australian subsidiary in October 2001. It was van Dyk's first released mix album and was followed by The Politics of Dancing 2 in 2005.

== Track listing ==
=== Disc 1 ===
1. Ashtrax - "Digital Reason"
2. Joker Jam - "Innocence (Paul van Dyk Remix)"
3. Private Taste - "First"
4. Jimpy - "Feeling Good (Original Version)"
5. Paul van Dyk - "Vega (Starecase Remix)" & Filmpalast - "I Want (Acapella)"
6. Southern Comforter - "Another Late Thursday"
7. iiO - "Rapture (Paul Van Dyk Remix)"
8. Sipping Soma - "Superconcious (So Alive) (Dubbed Coast 2 Coast House Mix)"
9. Timo Maas - "Killin' Me (Jan Driver Remix)"
10. Maji Na Damu - "B.W.Y. (DJ 19 & H. Garden Remix)"
11. U2 - "Elevation (Paul van Dyk Remix)"
12. Paul van Dyk - "Autumn"
13. Viframa - "Cristalle"
14. Solicitous - "Furthermost (Pure Pleasure Mix)"
15. Subsky - "Four Days (Gil Remix)"
16. Second Sun - "Empire (Paul van Dyk Remix)"
17. Paul van Dyk - "Out There"

=== Disc 2 ===
1. Sagitaire - "Shout, C'mon (Coast 2 Coast Mix)"
2. Mirco de Govia - "Epic Monolith"
3. Ralphie B - "Massive (Paul van Dyk Remix)"
4. David Forbes - "Questions Must Be Asked (Magica Mix)"
5. Way Out West - "Activity"
6. Connector - "Interference"
7. Blank & Jones - "Secrets & Lies (Solid Sessions Remix)"
8. Lexicon 4 - "Reach Me"
9. Jamnesia - "Reset"
10. 4 Strings - "Into The Night"
11. Active X - "Let's Go (Vank Mix)"
12. Signum - "In Progress"
13. Walter & Gelder - "Section O"
14. Solid Sleep - "Club Attack (Paul van Dyk Remix)"
15. Guardians of The Earth - "Starchildren (Quasi Dub)"
16. Nu NRG - "Dreamland"
