= Out There and Back =

Studio album by Paul van Dyk
- Released: June 5, 2000
- Genre: Trance
- Label: Vandit
- Producer: Paul van Dyk

Paul van Dyk chronology
Seven Ways (1996)	Out There and Back (2000)	The Politics of Dancing (2001)

Singles from Out There and Back
- 1. "Another Way" Released: 1999; 2. "Tell Me Why (The Riddle)" Released: 2000; 3. "We Are Alive" Released: 2000

Professional ratings
Review scores
Source	Rating
AllMusic	4/5 stars
Alternative Press	4/5 stars
Mixmag	5/5 stars
NME	8/10
Q	4/5 stars
Rolling Stone	3.5/5 stars

Out There and Back is the third studio album by Paul van Dyk. It was released in 2000 and is the first album released on his own Vandit record label. It can be seen as Paul van Dyk's breakthrough album. Several editions include a bonus CD.

The album is partially inspired by the science fiction film Contact (1997). The track "Another Way" would later be featured during a chase sequence of an episode from What's New, Scooby-Doo? while its B-side, "Avenue", would be used in the soundtrack of Wipeout 3.

== Track listing ==
Disc 1
No.	Title	Length
1.	"Vega" (vocals: Natascha van Dyk)	6:03
2.	"Pikes"	6:59
3.	"Another Way"	5:24
4.	"Travelling"	7:10
5.	"Avenue"	7:29
6.	"Tell Me Why (The Riddle)" (vocals: Saint Etienne)	7:53
7.	"Together We Will Conquer" (vocals: Natascha van Dyk)	7:23
8.	"Face to Face"	5:43
9.	"The Love from Above"	5:47
10.	"Columbia"	5:03
11.	"Out There and Back"	6:55
12.	"We Are Alive" (vocals: Jennifer Brown)	6:28

Disc 2
No.	Title	Length
1.	"Santos"	7:54
2.	"All I Need"	4:53
3.	"Namistai" (Produced with BT)	8:22
4.	"Another Way (Original)"	5:27
5.	"Tell Me Why (Vandit Mix Re-Edit)"	7:21
6.	"Tell Me Why (Club Mix)"	5:55
7.	"Face to Face (Piano Mix)"	6:14
8.	"Together We Will Conquer (Short Mix)"	3:32

== Charts ==
Chart performance for Out There and Back
Chart (2000)	Peak position
Australian Albums (ARIA)	41
Finnish Albums (Suomen virallinen lista)	34
German Albums (Offizielle Top 100)	19
UK Albums (OCC)	12
US Billboard 200	192
