= Tell Me Why (The Riddle) =

2000 single by Paul van Dyke

Single by Paul van Dyk featuring Saint Etienne

from the album Out There and Back
- Released: 8 May 2000
- Genre: Trance
- Length: 3:49
- Label: Universal; Vandit
- Songwriters: Paul van Dyk; Sarah Cracknell; Bob Stanley; Pete Wiggs
- Producer: Paul van Dyk

Paul van Dyk singles chronology
"Another Way/Avenue" (1999)	"Tell Me Why (The Riddle)" (2000)	"We Are Alive" (2000)

Saint Etienne singles chronology
"How We Used to Live" (2000)	"Tell Me Why (The Riddle)" (2000)	"Heart Failed (In the Back of a Taxi)" (2000)

Audio sample
- "Paul Van Dyk - Tell Me Why (The Riddle)": file; help

"Tell Me Why (The Riddle)" is a song by German DJ Paul van Dyk in collaboration with English indie dance band Saint Etienne, with Sarah Cracknell of the group on vocals. Released in May 2000, the song peaked at number seven on the UK Singles Chart, giving both acts their highest-charting UK hit. A music video was made along with the song that can be found on the Global DVD.

This song is a reworking of Paul van Dyk's instrumental track, The Riddle, which was released on the Schlaraffenland (1999) soundtrack.

== Track listings ==
German, US, and Australasian maxi-CD single

1. "Tell Me Why (The Riddle)" (radio mix) – 3:49
2. "Tell Me Why (The Riddle)" (Vandit mix) – 7:49
3. "Tell Me Why (The Riddle)" (club mix) – 4:52
4. "Tell Me Why (The Riddle)" (PVD mix) – 8:20
5. "Tell Me Why (The Riddle)" (Take a Break) – 6:09
6. "Tell Me Why (The Riddle)" (original mix) – 8:07

UK CD1 and cassette single

1. "Tell Me Why (The Riddle)" (radio mix) – 3:49
2. "Tell Me Why (The Riddle)" (PVD mix) – 8:48
3. "Tell Me Why (The Riddle)" (Take a Break) – 6:25

UK CD2

1. "Tell Me Why (The Riddle)" (Vandit mix) – 7:50
2. "Tell Me Why (The Riddle)" (club mix) – 4:52
3. "Tell Me Why (The Riddle)" (original mix) – 6:51

UK 12-inch single 1

A1. "Tell Me Why (The Riddle)" (Vandit mix) – 8:03
B1. "Tell Me Why (The Riddle)" (club mix) – 5:53
B2. "Tell Me Why (The Riddle)" (club dub) – 5:53

UK 12-inch single 2

A1. "Tell Me Why (The Riddle)" (original mix) – 8:43
B1. "Tell Me Why (The Riddle)" (Take a Break) – 7:31
B2. "Tell Me Why (The Riddle)" (Take a Break dub) – 7:15

US 2×12-inch single

A1. "Tell Me Why (The Riddle)" (Vandit mix) – 8:03
B1. "Tell Me Why (The Riddle)" (PVD mix) – 9:25
C1. "Tell Me Why (The Riddle)" (Take a Break) – 7:31
C2. "Tell Me Why (The Riddle)" (club mix) – 5:53
D1. "Tell Me Why (The Riddle)" (original mix) – 8:43
D2. "Tell Me Why (The Riddle)" (Take a Break dub) – 7:15

== Charts ==
=== Weekly charts ===
Chart (2000)	Peak position
Australia (ARIA)	57
Europe (Eurochart Hot 100)	32
Finland (Suomen virallinen lista)	15
Germany (GfK)	45
Ireland (IRMA)	19
Switzerland (Schweizer Hitparade)	82
UK Singles (OCC)	7
UK Dance (OCC)	1
UK Indie (OCC)	3
US Maxi-Singles Sales (Billboard)	11

=== Year-end charts ===
Chart (2000)	Position
UK Singles (OCC)	198
