= Deviant Records =

Defunct UK electronic music label

- Parent company: Phoenix Music International Ltd
- Founded: 1994
- Founder: Rob Deacon
- Defunct: 2007
- Status: Inactive
- Genre: Electronic, trance
- Country of origin: England, UK
- Location: London
- Official website: Website archive

Deviant Records was a London-based electronic music record label founded by publisher and music producer Rob Deacon in 1994. They published bands such as Pentatonik, Node (Flood, Ed Buller, Mel Wesson, Dave Bessell), Schematix, The Orb, Humate, Phat Gecko (Luke Corradine), Spooky, and Witchman. Deviant grew to be one a major independent dance label and represented Paul van Dyk, now one of the world's most successful DJs, and DJ Sammy. Disillusioned by the corporate consolidation within the music industry, as well as the increase in music downloads, Deacon sold Deviant Records to Phoenix Music International Ltd. in 2006. He died on 8 September 2007 in a canoeing accident.
