= Paul van Dyk =

German DJ (born 1971)

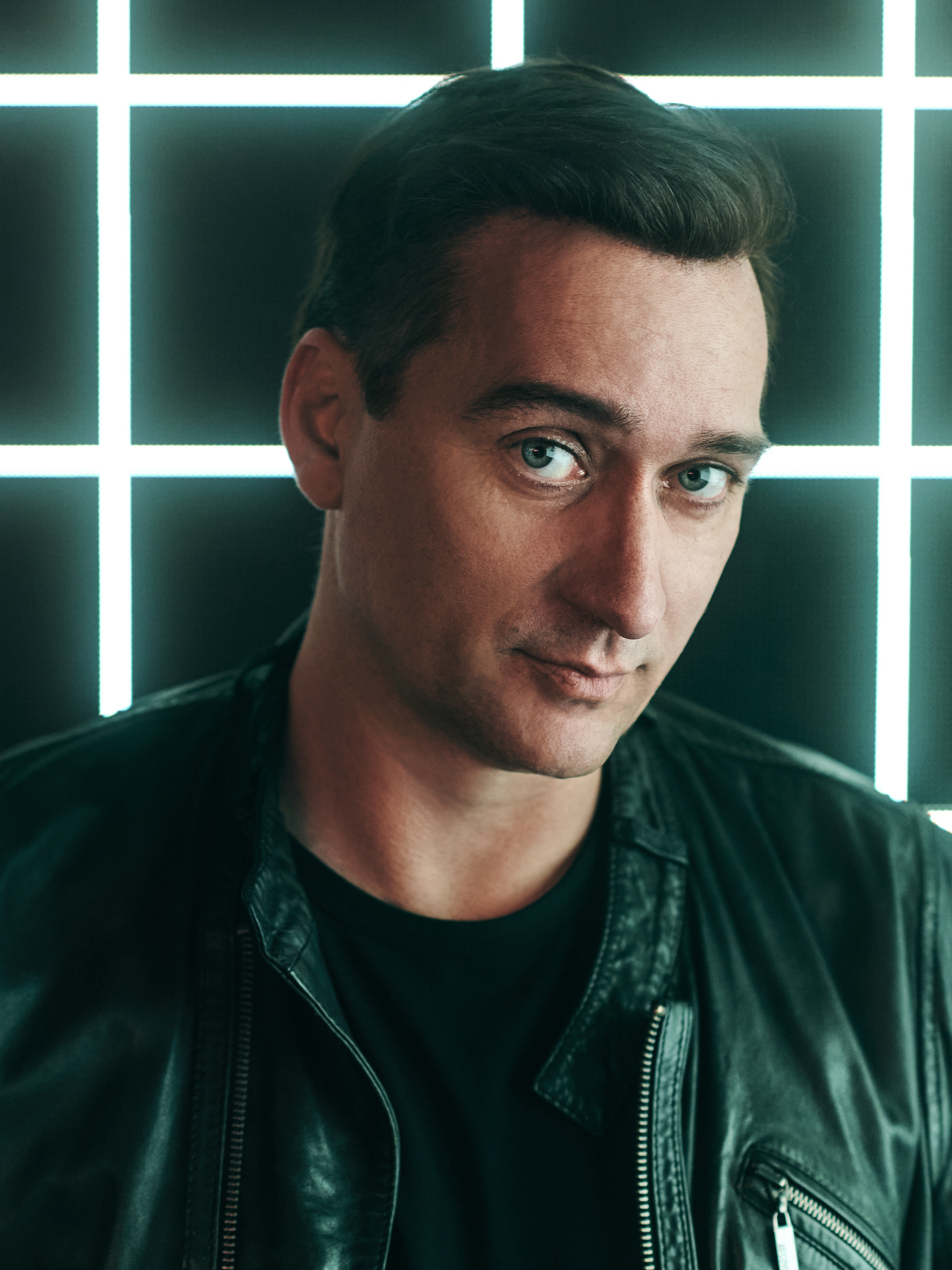
- Van Dyk in 2021

Background information
- Born: Matthias Paul; 16 December 1971 (age 54); Eisenhüttenstadt, East Germany
- Genres: Uplifting trance; progressive trance; house; progressive house; electro house; techno
- Occupations: DJ; record producer
- Instruments: Keyboards; mixer; synthesizer; turntables
- Years active: 1990–present
- Labels: Vandit; Armada; Black Hole; Spinnin'; Ultra; Deviant; Mute; Perfecto; MFS; Universal
- Website: paulvandyk.com

Matthias Paul (German pronunciation: [maˈtiːas ˈpaʊ̯l]; born 16 December 1971), known professionally as Paul van Dyk (German: [ˈpaʊ̯l fan ˈdʏk]) is a German DJ, record producer and musician. Van Dyk was the first artist to receive a Grammy Award nomination in the newly added category of Best Dance/Electronic album for his 2003 release Reflections. He was voted World No. 1 DJ by DJ Magazine in its annual Top 100 DJs poll in 2005 and 2006. Also, he was the first DJ to be named number one by Mixmag in 2005. By 2008, he had sold over 3 million albums worldwide.

A trance producer starting in the early 1990s, van Dyk quickly achieved popularity with his remix of "Love Stimulation" by Humate on the record label MFS in 1993 and with his hit single "For an Angel". Van Dyk is an avid trance lover to this day. He indicated in an interview that he ended up giving himself the Belgian-sounding stage name because he used to incorporate many Belgian dance records into his DJ sets in the early 1990s.

Van Dyk is the host of the radio show "VONYC Sessions", which reached 1000 episodes on January 4, 2026.

== Early life and career ==
=== Early life and musical beginning ===
Paul van Dyk grew up in East Berlin in a single parent household; his father left him and his mother when he was four years old. While living there, he worked as a broadcast technician and began training to become a carpenter. Paul van Dyk claims his musical education came from radio. Due to a lack of record stores to buy music from, van Dyk secretly listened to Western radio stations such as Radio in the American Sector and Sender Freies Berlin and mixtapes occasionally smuggled into the country and copied among school friends. The first album he acquired was Organisation by Orchestral Manoeuvres in the Dark, of which he said, "It was extremely influential. Early electronic, but also melodies and poppy elements, the general imprint of what later came for me in music."

Shortly before the fall of the Berlin Wall, van Dyk and his mother were given permission to leave East Germany and moved to Hamburg to live with his aunt. In 1990, van Dyk moved back to Berlin. His first appearance as a DJ was in the club Tresor in March 1991. After several more dates, he was given the chance to perform at Andre'Hoche's Dubmission parties in the Turbine club, together with the young resident DJ Kid Paul. With Cosmic Baby, he collaborated as The Visions of Shiva. Their single "Perfect Day" was released by the Berlin independent label MFS, run by English expatriate producer Mark Reeder and manager Torsten Jurk.

In February 1993, van Dyk and Kid Paul hosted an installment of the weekly three-hour "HR3 Clubnight" radio show, performing for a nationwide audience on German radio. The second and final Visions of Shiva single "How Much Can You Take?" was released, and van Dyk and Cosmic went their separate musical ways. By late summer, Paul released his first DJ-mix compilation "X-Mix-1 – the MFS Trip" and remixed Humate's trance hymn "Love Stimulation".

=== 1994–2007: 45 RPM, Seven Ways, Out There and Back and Reflections ===
External videos
- Paul van Dyk – My World (Official music video) (1994)

In 1994, van Dyk released The Green Valley EP, Pump This Party and Emergency 911. Meanwhile, MFS acquired many remixes for Paul. MFS label owner Mark Reeder's close friendship with artists such as New Order gave van Dyk the opportunity to mix the track "Spooky" from the Republic album. He recorded his debut LP 45 RPM with Johnny Klimek and VOOV.

Seven Ways established van Dyk as a trance pioneer and was van Dyk's first real success in Britain. Seven Ways was voted the No. 1 album by readers of DJ Magazine.

In early 1997, van Dyk began collaborating with U.S. music producer BT. Together, they produced tracks such as "Flaming June", "Forbidden Fruit" and "Namistai". The singles "Forbidden Fruit" and "Beautiful Place" did not cause a great impact at first but, with the release of Seven Ways and "Words" appearing at the height of the British superclub phenomenon, van Dyk's own material began to attract attention. "By the time they realised I was a German, it was too late!" van Dyk said. Van Dyk also remixed a well-known early-1990s track, "The Age of Love", in 1997.

In 1998, 45 RPM was re-released in the UK and in the US. To mark the event, and in homage to the defunct E-Werk, van Dyk released a remix of "For An Angel". Van Dyk took up a residency at Sheffield's Gatecrasher and declared himself anti-drugs, which led to home-made "No E, Pure PvD" T-shirts, also a sly note to journalists that his surname contained no "E". In 1998, Paul remixed Matt Laws/Binary Finary's famous "1998" single, which was a successful version that took Binary Finary to the top of the German Dance charts.

In mid-1998, van Dyk left MFS Records and took a controlling share in the new label Vandit Records. In 2000, van Dyk flexed his skills with his melodic, dancefloor-friendly Out There and Back, which included the hit single "Tell Me Why (The Riddle)", a collaboration with Saint Etienne. It also included the European hit We Are Alive, a remixed version of the Jennifer Brown song Alive. His first mix album The Politics of Dancing (2001) was followed by a world tour and a DVD release Global (2003) and the Mexican film Zurdo, for which van Dyk composed the soundtrack and won a Mexican Oscar for his work.

Reflections (2003) inspired by van Dyk's trips to India, was a more melancholy affair, and includes the single "Nothing But You", a collaboration with Hemstock & Jennings. It was nominated for a Grammy in the category of Best Electronic Album. The same song was also used on the soundtrack of the game FIFA 2004. The mix album The Politics of Dancing 2 (2005) was preceded by a single "The Other Side," featuring Wayne Jackson; a song dedicated to the victims, and their families, of the Sumatra-Andaman earthquake and the subsequent tsunami that struck Thailand on 26 December 2004. His original productions from Reflections have been synced into major motion pictures such as Into the Blue, Sisterhood of the Traveling Pants, television's Entertainment Tonight and MTV Cribs, and international ad campaigns for Motorola, HBO, Land Rover, Ski Vail and most recently for Jeep.

In 2005 and 2006 he was voted the number 1 DJ in the world according to DJ Magazine.

=== 2007–2010: In Between ===
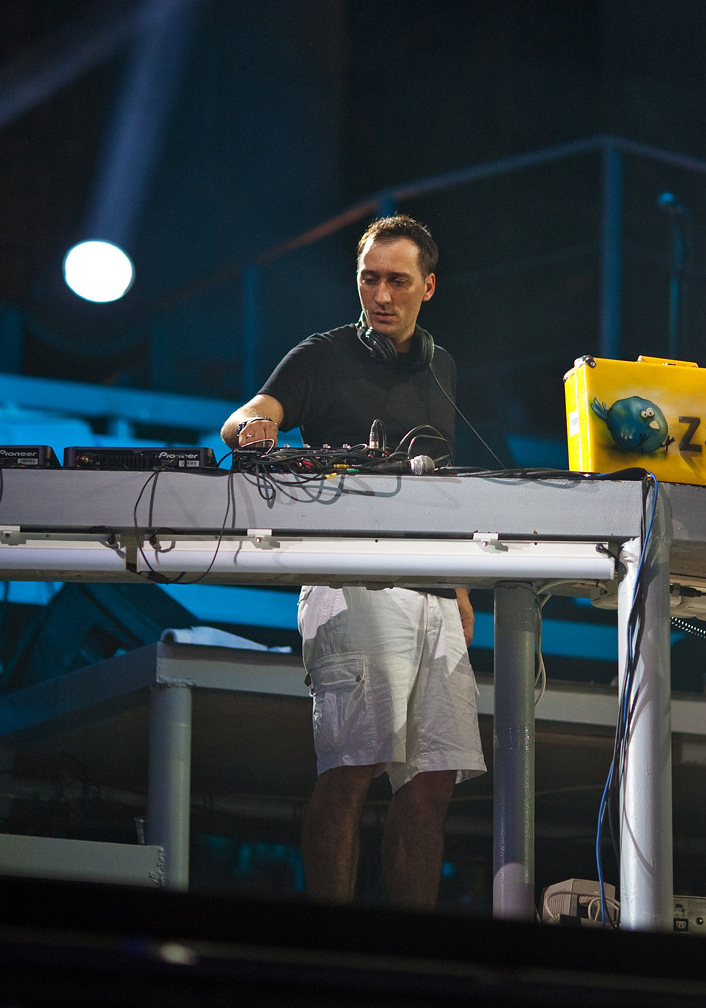
Van Dyk performing at KaZantip, 2009

Van Dyk released his fifth studio album, In Between, worldwide on 14 August 2007. The album, which he created over a three-year period, debuted at number No. 115 on the Billboard 200 and No. 2 on the Billboard's Top Electronic Albums and No. 1 on the Top Heatseekers. The album also reached No. 16 on the Mexican Albums Chart and No. 5 on the Mexican International Chart. The album was released accompanied by a special edition limited to two thousand copies which included a mixed version of the full album, along with an eight-track bonus CD and an eight-page photo anthology.

The album was produced primarily by Paul van Dyk himself, and features a wide range of collaborators including David Byrne of Talking Heads, Jessica Sutta of the Pussycat Dolls, Ashley Tomberlin from Luminary, Alex M.O.R.P.H, Lo Fi Sugar, Rea Garvey of Reamonn, Ryan Merchant and Wayne Jackson. It also features a vocal sample from Ben Lost from Probspot's "Blows My Mind" on the song "Another Sunday". In June 2007, van Dyk embarked on the worldwide "In Between Tour" to promote the album.

Van Dyk's work with EA Games has resulted in multiple releases featuring his music in Mirror's Edge, Need for Speed: Underground 2 and Grand Slam Tennis. The song was released on the film's soundtrack, and helped the album win a Grammy Award that Paul van Dyk shares with his collaborators. He has also remixed Depeche Mode's "Martyr", Justin Timberlake's "What Goes Around... Comes Around" and Britney Spears' "Gimme More".

In May 2008, van Dyk set up a remix competition with digital download network Beatport, inviting aspiring producers to remix his single 'Far Away' which appeared on his album In Between.

On 9 November 2009, van Dyk performed alongside Northern Ireland vocalist Johnny McDaid at the Berlin Wall 20th Anniversary Memorial. They recorded and performed a song for the event called 'We Are One'.; A dance music event, called 'We Are One Festival', was organized at the O2 World Berlin, named after the song he collaborated with Johnny McDaid on for the Berlin Wall Anniversary. Some artists who performed included Armin van Buuren, Underworld and Blueman Group.

In 2010, it was revealed that van Dyk's record label Vandit would be merging with Armin van Buuren's Armada Music.

=== 2012–2015: Evolution and The Politics of Dancing 3 ===
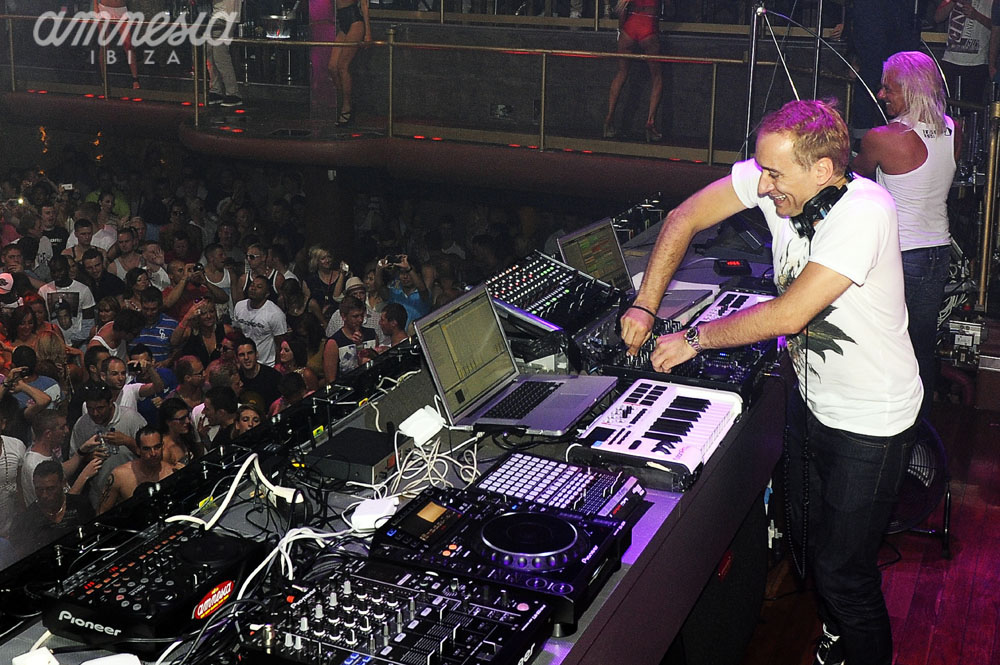
Paul van Dyk at Amnesia, Ibiza, 2012

Van Dyk's sixth studio album, titled Evolution was released on 3 April 2012. The track "Eternity" was made in collaboration with Owl City's Adam Young. Evolution also features producers Arty, Austin Leeds, Giuseppe Ottaviani and Ummet Ozcan. The album features vocals from Johnny McDaid of Snow Patrol, Plumb, Sarah Howells and various other artists.

This release was followed by The Politics of Dancing 3, which van Dyk put out on 4 May 2015. With its release, the series, which began in 2001, moved from that of music compilation to artist album. On it, van Dyk worked with artists including Aly & Fila, Giuseppe Ottaviani and others.

=== 2016–present: Fall incident/injuries and new albums ===
On 29 February 2016, during the A State of Trance Festival in Utrecht, van Dyk fell through a concealed gap in the stage during his performance, and was transported to a local hospital. Due to a spinal injury and severe brain injury, van Dyk remained under doctors' supervision at Utrecht Medical Center for weeks. He was cleared for professional medical transfer to a facility in Berlin until mid-May 2016. Numerous performances suffered forced cancellations during this time, including the Electric Daisy Carnival Mexico.

Van Dyk began a light touring schedule mid-June 2016, including Electric Daisy Carnival in Las Vegas, Cream at Amnesia in Ibiza, and Luminosity Festival in the Netherlands.

Van Dyk's accident forced a significant delay in the recording of his eighth studio album. Having continued to convalesce, van Dyk was able to complete the album in the early summer of 2017. From Then On was released on 20 October of the same year through his own Vandit label. Subsequently, van Dyk drew on the experiences of the preceding year, which were most clearly evidenced in the track's titles. It received positive feedback from the press, with Billboard calling it "a celebration of a beautiful life." and the website EDMSauce describing it as "near flawless." Musically the album continued in largely the same artistic vein as The Politics of Dancing 3 and included collaborations with – amongst others – Alex M.O.R.P.H., M.I.K.E. Push and Jordan Suckley. The lead single "Everyone Needs Love" was released on 23 December 2016, with the final one "Breaking Dawn" arriving 14 months later on 23 February 2018.

In January 2019, van Dyk was awarded $12 million in damages against ALDA, the organizer of the A State of Trance event in 2016, in which van Dyk fell on stage and got injured. The court deemed that ALDA had not designed the stage to be safe to stand on, nor had they warned van Dyk that part of the stage was unstable.

On 29 February 2024, van Dyk disclosed on social media that due to the fall incident in 2016, he has suffered life long consequences and he is still not well. He also stated that even though the Nederlands high court had awarded him damages against ALDA, he had not yet been paid anything and that they even tried to stop his insurance from paying him the hospital bills. In responses, ALDA stated that the matter was in the hands of their attorneys and insurance companies.

== Politics ==
Since 2001, van Dyk has taken an interest in politics. His creation of The Politics of Dancing compilation was inspired by electronic dance music's universal acclaim by different people around the world. "Palestinians are dancing with Israelis. Lebanese people are dancing with Israelis – without war, without anything in their minds other than treating each other respectfully", said van Dyk in 2006. He also has called EDM "a political and diplomatic tool that could be used." Having grown up with little freedom, his musical career has helped him voice his opinions about politics. He opposed the Iraq War and the War in Afghanistan. He describes himself as anti-war and has advertised this while performing, by wearing a shirt reading "Make peace, not war".

Van Dyk has helped fight poverty by supporting social programs to help disadvantaged people in India, New York, and Berlin. He also participated in Rock the Vote in 2004 and 2008; he and Bono being the only non-American artists to join the campaign encouraging young people to vote.

== Discography ==
Studio albums

- 45 RPM (1994)
- Seven Ways (1996)
- Out There and Back (2000)
- Reflections (2003)
- In Between (2007)
- Evolution (2012)
- The Politics of Dancing 3 (2015)
- From Then On (2017)
- Music Rescues Me (2018)
- Guiding Light (2020)
- This World Is Ours (2025)
- The State of Things (2027)

Ambient albums

- Escape Reality (2020)

== Soundtracks ==
=== Films ===
- 2003: Zurdo

=== Video games ===
- 1999: WipEout 3 ("Avenue")
- 2008: Mirror's Edge (additional remix)
- 2009: Grand Slam Tennis
- 2012: Grand Slam Tennis 2

== Honours ==
- Order of Merit of Berlin (2006)

== Awards and nominations ==
Awards and achievements
| Preceded by n/a | Mixmag Number 1 DJ; 2005 | Succeeded by Erol Alkan |
| Preceded by Tiësto | DJ Magazine Number 1 DJ; 2005–2006 | Succeeded by Armin van Buuren |
