= Club Mix =

Remix album by Sonique
- Released: 10 July 2001
- Label: EMI International

Sonique chronology
Hear My Cry (2000)	Club Mix (2001)	Born to Be Free (2003)

Club Mix is a two-disc album remixed by British musician/DJ Sonique and released in 2001.

== Track listing ==
=== Disc one ===
1. "Right On Right On" - Silicone Soul
2. "Guitar Track" (Silicone Soul Dark Room Dub) - Colours
3. "Mind Made Up" (Robbie Rivera's Dark Dub) - Xtra Large
4. "Travelling On" (Koma and Bones Remix) - Beber & Tamra
5. "Slippery Track" (Dano's Pre-Flight Dub) - Mood II Swing
6. "10 in 01" (Paul Van Dyk's Members Only Mix) - Members of Mayday
7. "Scram" - Plump DJs
8. "New Year's Dub" - Musique vs. U2
9. "Groove No. 1" (Original Solaris Mix) - True Gold
10. "Can't Take the Feeling" (Fab Club Version) - Acrisio & Romagnoli
11. "Struggle for Pleasure" (Filterheadz Remix) - Minimalistix
12. "Black Sun" (Total Eclipse Mix) - Jamie Anderson
13. "Musak" (Steve Lawler Remix) - Trisco
14. "Let's Beuk" (Original Mix) - Dulux Connection
15. "Even More Bounce" - Silvio Ecomo
16. "Secrets" (Ian Wilkie's C-Bit Dub) - Mutiny UK
17. "Inner Laugh" (James Holden Remix) - Roland Klinkenberg
18. "Days Go By" (Lucien Foot Remix) - Dirty Vegas
19. "Number 4" (A-Side) - Zero ID
20. "Tantric" - Tronica
21. "Café del Mar '98" (Original Three 'N One Mix/It Feels So Good Acappella) - Energy 52 & Sonique

=== Disc two ===
1. "Destiny Calls" (Peak Energy Mix) - JDS
2. "Storm" (Jan Driver Remix) - Storm
3. "No Alternative" (Extended Mix) - RBA
4. "Ancient Myth" - Mac Zimms
5. "Sound of: Oh Yeah" (Original Mix) - Tomba Vira
6. "Amber" (Silk Mix) - Natious
7. "Jingalay" (Praha Instrumental Mix) - Rouge
8. "Pounds and Pénz" (Alex Flatner Deutsche Mark Remix) - Corvin Dalek
9. "Innocente" (Falling in Love) (Deep Dish Gladiator Remix) - Delerium & Leigh Nash
10. "Flypaper" - Mr. Spring
11. "Control" - Pro-tech
12. "Flight 643" - Tiësto
13. "Shine On" (Electrique Boutique Mix) - Scott & Leon
14. "Prosac" (Marc Manga Remix) - Tomcraft
15. "Ghosts in the Church" - Body Shock
16. "Drill" (Original Mix) - Dirt Devils
17. "Sunrise" (Club Mix) - Ratty
