= Wim Mertens =

Flemish Belgian composer, musician, and musicologist

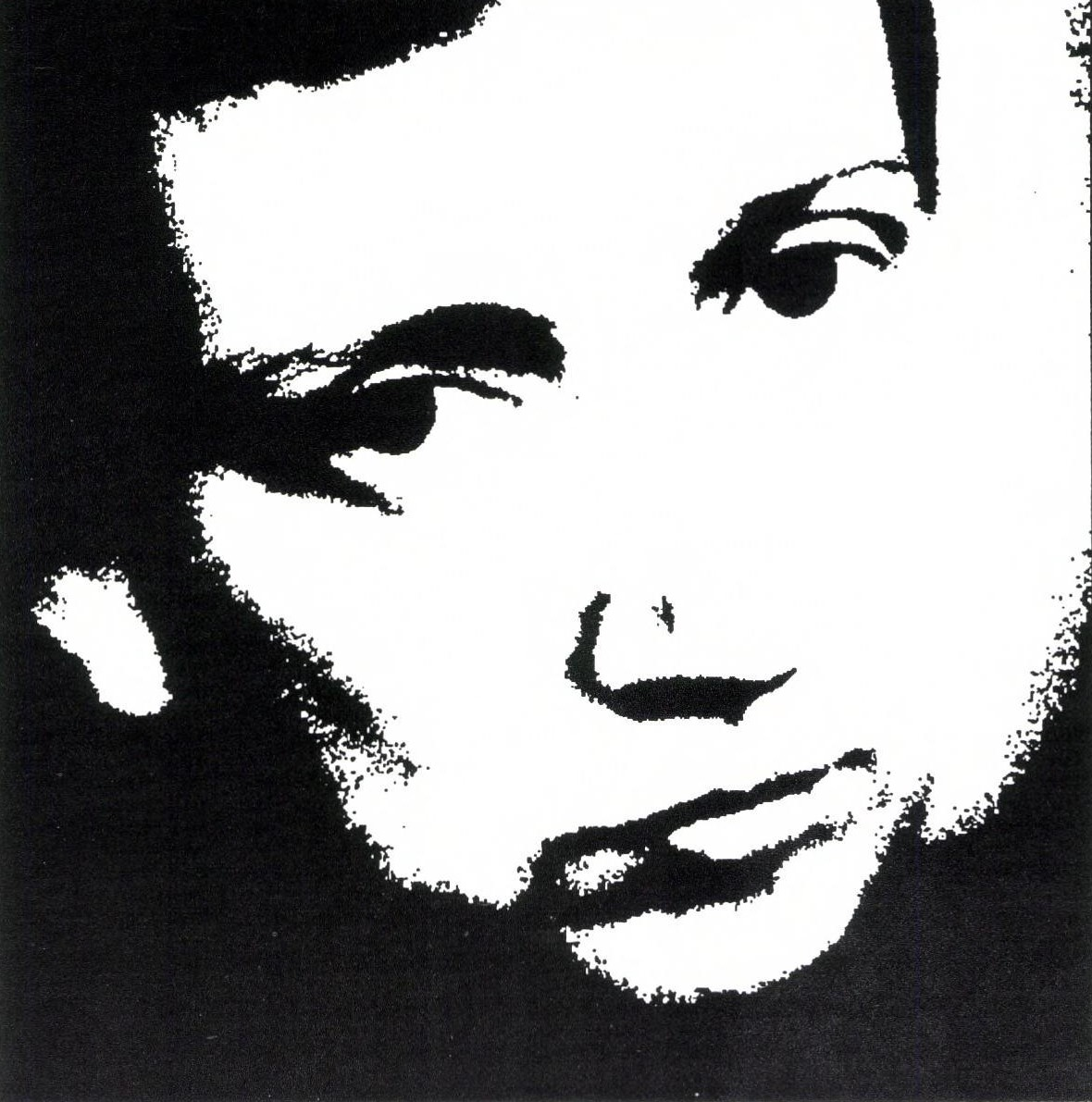

Background information
- Born: Neerpelt, Belgium
- Genres: New Music, avant-garde, contemporary classical, minimalism
- Occupations: Musician, composer
- Instruments: Piano, keyboards
- Labels: WimMertensMusic, Windham Hill
- Website: www.wimmertens.com

Wim Mertens (Dutch pronunciation: [ʋɪˈmɛrtəns]) is a Flemish-Belgian composer, countertenor vocalist, pianist, guitarist, and musicologist.

== Life and work ==
Mertens was born in Neerpelt, Belgium. He studied social and political science at the University of Leuven (graduating in 1975) and musicology at Ghent University; he also studied music theory and piano at the Ghent Conservatory and the Royal Conservatory of Brussels.

In 1978, he became a producer at the BRT (Belgian Radio and Television, now called Vlaamse Radio- en Televisieomroep). For Radio 2 (Radio Brabant) he produced concerts by Philip Glass, Steve Reich, Terry Riley, Meredith Monk, Urban Sax and others, and hosted a program called Funky Town together with Gust De Meyer (with whom he recorded the experimental album For Amusement Only).

Known primarily as a composer since the early 1980s, Mertens began developing a reputation after releasing "Struggle for Pleasure", under the name of his early ensemble Soft Verdict, and for "Maximizing the Audience", which was composed for Jan Fabre's play The Power of Theatrical Madness, which premiered in 1984 in Venice, Italy.

Mertens' style has continually evolved during the course of his prolific career, starting from experimental and avant-garde, always gravitating around minimalism, usually, however, preserving a melodic foundation to the forays that he makes into the worlds that he is exploring. His compositional quality has often overweighted the "labelling issue" and reached wider audiences although stemming from a far-from-mainstream musical context (see section In popular culture). One can follow three separate threads of musical styles throughout his work:

1. Compositions for ensemble, perhaps his most accessible and "commercial" material;
2. Solo piano and voice compositions, which features haunting keyboard melodies accompanied by Mertens' unique high-pitched tenor voice singing in an invented, personal language; and
3. Experimental minimalist "cycles" for single, dual, and sometimes more instruments.

Mertens has released more than 60 albums to date, the majority of which were issued by Les Disques du Crépuscule from 1980 until 2004. Mertens also produced a number of Crépuscule releases and consulted with the label on its choice of works by contemporary composers such as Michael Nyman, Gavin Bryars, and Glenn Branca. Mertens also curated a series of releases for a Crépuscle imprint, Lome Armé, that featured works from the classical era as well as contemporary jazz.

In August 2007 Mertens signed a contract with EMI Classics (now Warner Classics) for his entire catalogue. The label re-released his entire back-catalogue beginning in January 2008. EMI Music Belgium also released Mertens' new work, beginning with the 9-track album Receptacle on 24 September 2007. For this album Mertens decided to work with an orchestra consisting of only women, 17 in total. It is not the first time that Mertens worked with EMI. Already in 1999, Mertens released the soundtrack to the Paul Cox film Molokai: The Story of Father Damien via EMI Classics.

Mertens is the author of American Minimal Music, which looks at the school of American repetitive music and the work of La Monte Young, Terry Riley, Steve Reich, and Philip Glass.

== Discography ==
- 1982 – For Amusement Only – The Sound of Pinball Machines (full album)
- 1982 – Vergessen (full album)
- 1983 – Struggle for Pleasure* (album)
- 1984 – A Visiting Card (E.P. album)
- 1985 – Usura* (full album)
- 1985 – Maximizing the Audience (album)
- 1986 – Close Cover
- 1986 – A Man of no Fortune, and with a Name to Come
- 1986 – Instrumental Songs
- 1987 – Educes Me**
- 1987 – The Belly of an Architect
- 1988 – Whisper Me (L.P. compilation)
- 1988 – After Virtue
- 1989 – Motives for Writing
- 1990 – No Testament (single taken from After Virtue)
- 1990 – Play for Me (compilation box)
- 1991 – Alle Dinghe - pt. I: Sources of Sleeplessness
- 1991 – Alle Dinghe - pt. II: Vita Brevis
- 1991 – Alle Dinghe - pt. III: Alle Dinghe
- 1991 – Stratégie De La Rupture
- 1991 – Hufhuf [single taken from Stratégie de la Rupture with ***Previously Unreleased Track(s)]
- 1992 – Houfnice
- 1992 – Retrospectives - vol. 1
- 1992 – Shot and Echo
- 1993 – A Sense of Place
- 1994 – Epic That Never Was (a live recording in Lisbon)
- 1994 – Gave van Niets - promo only
- 1994 – Gave van Niets - pt. I: You'll Never be Me
- 1994 – Gave van Niets - Part II: Divided Loyalties
- 1994 – Gave van Niets - pt. III: Gave van Niets
- 1994 – Gave van Niets - pt. IV: Reculer pour Mieux Sauter
- 1995 – Jeremiades
- 1996 – Entre Dos Mares
- 1996 – Lisa
- 1996 – Jardin Clos
- 1996 – Piano & Voice
- 1997 – Sin Embargo
- 1997 – Best of
- 1998 – In 3 or 4 Days (single taken from Integer Valor)
- 1998 – Integer Valor
- 1998 – Integer Valor - integral
- 1998 – And Bring You Back
- 1999 – Father Damien
- 1999 – Integer Valor – Intégrale
- 1999 – Kere Weerom - pt. I: Poema
- 1999 – Kere Weerom - pt. II: Kere Weerom
- 1999 – Kere Weerom - pt. III: Decorum
- 2000 – If I Can
- 2000 – Der Heisse Brei
- 2001 – At Home – Not at Home
- 2001 – Aren Lezen - promo only
- 2001 – Aren Lezen - pt. I: If Five is Part of Ten
- 2001 – Aren Lezen - pt. II: Aren Lezen
- 2001 – Aren Lezen - pt. III: Kaosmos
- 2001 – Aren Lezen - pt. IV: aRe
- 2002 – Years without History - vol. 1 – Moins de Mètre, Assez de Rythme
- 2002 – Years without History - vol. 2 – In the Absence of Hindrance
- 2002 – Years without History - vol. 3 – Cave Musicam
- 2002 – Wim Mertens Moment
- 2003 – Years without History - vol. 4 – No Yet, no Longer
- 2003 – Skopos
- 2003 - Ver-Veranderingen (early vignettes/sketches from 1981)
- 2004 – Years without History - vol. 5 – With no Need for Seeds
- 2004 – Shot and Echo
- 2005 – Un Respiro
- 2006 – Partes Extra Partes
- 2007 – Receptacle
- 2008 – Platinum Collection
- 2008 – l'Heure du loup
- 2008 – Years without History - vol. 1–6 (vol. 6 is only available at this set)
- 2008 – Years without History - vol. 7: Nosotros
- 2009 – Music and Film (3-CD set ]
- 2009 – The World Tout Court
- 2009 – QUA (37-CD reissue set of the extended cycle works Alle Dinghe, Gave van Niets, Kere Weerom and Aren Lezen)
- 2010 – Zee versus Zed
- 2011 – Series of Ands/Immediate Givens (2-CD double album)
- 2011 – Open Continuum/Tenerife Symphony Orchestra (OST) (2-CD + 1-DVD)
- 2012 – *Struggle for Pleasure
  - Double Entendre: 1-CD reissue with 2 albums on one CD (3-CD set).
- 2012 – A Starry Wisdom
- 2012 – When Tool met Wood
- 2015 – Charaktersketch
- 2016 – What are we, locks, to do?
- 2016 – Dust of Truths
- 2017 – Cran aux Œufs
- 2017 - Nature's Largess (live)
- 2018 – That Which is Not
- 2019 - Certain Nuances Excepted (live)
- 2019 - Inescapable (4-CD compilation)
- 2020 - The Gaze of the West
- 2022 - Heroides
- 2023 - Voice of the Living
- 2024 - Ranges of Robustness
- 2025 - As Water Is To Fish

== In popular culture ==
- With that same title, the collection of electronic music Café del Mar features in its 5th volume "Close Cover", one of the most melodic and, in a way, classical pieces of the author.
- "Struggle for Pleasure" was directly covered by Belgian dance music project Minimalistix in 2000 and reached the Top 40 in the charts in many European countries including the United Kingdom, Belgium and the Netherlands. The group also did a successful cover of, again, "Close Cover".
- A cover appeared in 2001 on Gatecrasher Digital. Elastica presents Jesus Elices 'Maximizing the Audience'.
- The James Bond novel High Time to Kill (Raymond Benson, 1999) contains a passing reference to the music of Wim Mertens, in which characters in the novel comment on the music playing in a cafe. Benson, the fourth official James Bond novelist, is a fan of Mertens' music. The reference is somewhat ironic given the interest in James Bond culture shown by Michel Duval, the founder of Les Disques du Crépuscule.
- "Struggle for Pleasure" also inspired one of the most influential electronic dance music tracks – Energy 52's trance music project called "Café Del Mar", first released on Eye Q Records in 1993. It became a successful hit in 1997 with Three 'n One remix, and Nalin & Kane remixes in 1998. In April 2011, the song was voted number one in Pete Tong's Top 20 Dance Tracks of the last 20 years.
- "Struggle for Pleasure" is often used in advertisements of Belgian telecommunications provider Proximus.
- His song "Iris" was used as the soundtrack for the Swedish Armed Forces’ commercial campaign "Vi lämnar Sverige ifred" (”We leave Sweden at peace") during the autumn-winter of 2017.
