= Ralf Hildenbeutel =

German composer and producer (born 1969)

Ralf Hildenbeutel (born 6 March 1969) is a German composer and producer.

== Life and career ==
Ralf Hildenbeutel has a classical education in piano and composition and got early into electronic music. In the 1990s he was noted for collaborating with Sven Väth with whom he produced Väth's major albums between 1991 and 1998 such as "An Accident in Paradise", "Barbarella" or "The Harlequin, the Robot, and the Ballet-Dancer". During this period Hildenbeutel was one of the main producers for the electronic music label Eye Q Records with A.C. Boutsen and Stevie B-Zet. With his crossover electro live act project "Earth Nation” he debuted at the Montreux Jazz Festival in 1994 and continued to play around Europe until they split up in 1999. Hildenbeutel also collaborated on various club releases under project names such as "Cygnus X", "Odyssey of Noises" and others. The scene magazine Frontpage wrote in 1995 that around 90% of all trance-releases that time had been influenced by the typical EYE Q sound and Mixmag named the Väth's Album "An Accident in Paradise" one of the 50 best dance albums ever. In the 90s he also started to work regularly on film music for movies such as the experimental art-docu movie "Hommage à Noir" (1996).

When the Eye Q label moved to Berlin in 1997 Hildenbeutel stayed in Frankfurt. Together with A.C. Boutsen and Stevie B-Zet he founded the production company "Schallbau". Hildenbeutel turned from techno to artist production and produced an co-wrote for artists such as Simon Collins, Laith Al-Deen, Yvonne Catterfeld or Andreas Bourani with whom he achieved several top ten entries.

In 2008 Schallbau split up and Ralf started to focus on film music and his solo works.

Hildenbeutel received several awards such as the Gold Medal at the New York Festivals for "Hommage à Noir" (1997) and the VIVA Comet as best producer (1996). In 2013 his music for "Momentum" was nominated at the Newport International Festival) and in 2017 he received the "Golden Horse" at the International Filmfest Dresden for "Eine Villa mit Pinien (A Pine Tree Villa)"

== Filmography (selection) ==
- 2025: Màkari 4
- 2025: Sara - la donna nell’ombra(limited series)
- 2025: Padre
- 2024: Supersex (limited series)
- 2024: Màkari (3rd season)
- 2023: Indagine su una storia d'amore
- 2023: Monterossi (2nd season)
- 2023: Everybody Loves Diamonds (limited series)
- 2022: Màkari (2nd season)
- 2022: Monterossi (limited series)
- 2021: Chiamami ancora amore (limited series)
- 2021: Màkari (limited series)
- 2020: Il Silenzio dell'Acqua (2nd season)
- 2020: Io ti cercherò (limited series)
- 2020: Aldilà dei giganti (short)
- 2020: Something Evil Becomes Us (short)
- 2020: La Concessione Del Telefono
- 2020: La Guerra é Finita (limited series)
- 2019: Kommissarin Lucas - Polly
- 2019: Non Mentire (limited series)
- 2019: La Stagione della Caccia
- 2019: Il Silenzio dell'Acqua (limited series)
- 2018: Die Aldi-Brüder
- 2018: Lehmann. Gier frisst Herz
- 2018: La Mossa Del Cavallo
- 2018: Kommissarin Lucas, "Das Urteil"
- 2018: Afterword
- 2017: Maltese - Il Romanzo del Commissario
- 2016: Tod einer Kadettin
- 2016: Burg Schreckenstein
- 2016: Kommissarin Lucas, "Der Kreuzweg"
- 2016: Eine Villa mit Pinien
- 2015: Kommissarin Lucas, "Der Wald"
- 2014: Der Koch
- 2014: Conduct
- 2013: Momentum (short-movie)
- 2013: Bastard
- 2012: Ausgerechnet Sibirien
- 2012: Bye Bye Super 8 (short-movie)
- 2011: Kommissarin Lucas, "Gier"
- 2010: Vincent Wants to Sea
- 2006: Reine Formsache
- 2001: Mondscheintarif
- 2001: Be.Angeled
- 2000: Und das ist erst der Anfang
- 1998: Caipiranha
- 1996: Hommage à Noir
- 1989: Nimm die Spinnen weg
- 1989: Karambolage

== Discography (selection) ==
- 2025: "Màkari - Quarta Stagione" (OST)
- 2025: "Sara - La Donna nell'Ombra" (OST)
- 2025: "Padre" (OST)
- 2024: "Supersex" (OST)
- 2024: "Zwei Jahre" FEE. (EP)
- 2024: "Màkari - Terza stagione" (OST)
- 2023: "Monterossi 2" (OST)
- 2023: "Everbody Loves Diamnonds" (OST)
- 2023: "Another Night" (remix album, with Chris Liebing)
- 2022: "Màkari - Seconda Stagione" (OST)
- 2022: "Monterossi" (OST)
- 2021: "Another Day" (album, with Chris Liebing)
- 2021: "Chiamami ancora amore" (OST)
- 2021: "Màkari" (OST)
- 2020: "Io ti cercherò" (OST)
- 2020: "Something Evil Becomes Us" (OST)
- 2020: "La Concessione del Telefono" (OST)
- 2020: "La guerra è finita" (OST)
- 2019: "Il Silenzio dell'Acqua" (OST)
- 2019: "La Stagione della Caccia" (OST)
- 2019: "Afterword" (OST)
- 2018: "Chris Liebing - Burn Slow" (Album)
- 2018: "La Mossa Del Cavallo" (OST)
- 2017: "Maltese" (OST)
- 2016: "Burg Schreckenstein" (OST)
- 2016: "Moods - The Retouched Themes"
- 2015: "Moods" (Solo Album)
- 2014: "Der Koch" (OST with Stevie B-Zet)
- 2013: "Momentum" (OST)
- 2013: "Bastard" (OST with Stevie B-Zet)
- 2012: "Ausgerechnet Sibirien" (OST with Stevie B-Zet)
- 2011: "Vincent will meer" (OST with Stevie B-Zet)
- 2011: Andreas Bourani "Frieden"
- 2010: "Wunderland" (Solo Album)
- 2010: "Hegemund - Nuit blanche" (with Gottfried Tollmann)
- 2008: "Lucy's Dream" (Solo Album)
- 2007: "Music from the Scape" (Solo Album)
- 2007: Sandra, re-production of "Maria Magdalena" & "Hiroshima"
- 2006: I Love Pop "Songs from the Whiteshed" (Album)
- 2003 - 2005: Yvonne Catterfeld, diverse
- 2003: Tom Albrecht, ("Sing", "Wir sind eins", "360 Grad")
- 2001 - 2007: Laith Al-Deen ("Ich will nur wissen" 2001, "Melomanie" 2002, "Für Alle" 2004, "Die Frage wie" 2005), "Die Liebe zum Detail" 2007)
- 1999: Simon Collins "All of Who You Are"
- 1998: Schallbau "Schallbau's Point Zero Vol. 1" (Album)
- 1996: "Hommage à Noir" (OST)
- 1997: Yello, "To the Sea" with Stina Nordenstam
- 1990 - 1997: Badesalz, diverse
- 1996: "TollmannHildenbeutel" (mit Gottfried Tollmann, Album)
- 1993: "Looking Beyond" (Solo Album)
- 1992 - 1997: Sven Väth ("Fusion" 1997, "The Harlequin, The Robot and The Ballet-Dancer" 1994, "Accident in Paradise" 1992, "Barbarella - The Art of Dance" 1992)
- 1994 - 1998: Earth Nation ("Amnesie" 1998, "Live..." 1996, "Live in Montreux" 1994, "Terra Incognito" 1995, "Thoughts in Past Future" 1994)
- 1993 - 1996: "Odyssee of Noises" (diverse)
- 1993: "Curare"
- 1993: "Progressive Attack"
- 1992: "Zyon"
- 1993 - 1995: "Cygnus X" (diverse)
- 1991: "Mignon"

== Remixes (selection) ==
Goldfrapp, Depeche Mode, Fahrenhaidt, The Fred Banana Combo, Anne Clark, Robert Palmer, Yello, Enigma, Sandra, Stina Nordenstam, Oomph!, Laurent Garnier, Ofrin, Cartridge, Energy 52.
