= Thinking About Myself =

Studio album by Cosmic Baby
- Released: 1994
- Studio: Highlights Studio Berlin
- Genre: Techno, trance, house, chill-out, electro
- Length: 72:27
- Label: Logic Records LOC LP 10; Time Out of Mind Records
- Producer: Cosmic Baby

Cosmic Baby chronology
Stellar Supreme (1992)	Thinking About Myself (1994)	Fourteen Pieces: Selected Works 1995 (1996)

Professional ratings
Review scores
Source	Rating
AllMusic	4/5 stars

Thinking About Myself is a studio album by German techno/trance artist Cosmic Baby which was released in 1994. It is Cosmic Baby's second studio album.

== Reception ==
John Bush of Allmusic stated "Cosmic Baby's second album is one of the high points of a uniquely Teutonic wish to apply Wagnerian concepts of orchestration and grandeur to techno and trance, in a similar fashion to Sven Väth's Accident in Paradise. While Väth is best at constructing beats and rhythms (to the detriment of his bloated quasi-orchestrations), Cosmic Baby proves more than equal to the symphonic task at hand, while his percussion skills rarely arouse any excitement at all. Despite several obvious high points ("Loops of Infinity," "Au Dessous des Nuages," "Cosmic Greets Florida"), the album attempts much but accomplishes little."

== Track listing ==
All tracks are written by Cosmic Baby

No.	Title	Length
1.	"Thinking About Myself"	5:20
2.	"Treptow"	6:23
3.	"Tao 2000"	6:41
4.	"Another Day in Another City"	3:41
5.	"Brooklyn"	5:21
6.	"Au Dessous des Nuages"	9:52
7.	"Cosmic Greets Florida"	5:56
8.	"Herbst in Berlin"	5:03
9.	"Fantasia"	8:02
10.	"Loops of Infinity (Contemplative)"	7:13
11.	"Movements in Love" (called "Moments in Love" on the sleeve of the release on the Logic label)	8:50
Total length:		72:27

== Personnel ==
Band

- Cosmic Baby – composer, primary artist, producer
- Lisa – vocals
- Jens Mahlstedt – guitar
- Jens Wojnar – guitar, producer

Production

- F.J. Hjordis – design, illustrations
- Eike Konig – art direction, design
- Wolfgang Ragwitz – mastering
