= Filterheadz =

Belgian techno DJ and production duo

- Genres: Techno, Progressive Trance
- Years active: 1998–present
- Members: Bert Wilmaers (guitar); Maarten Wilmaers (drums)
- Website: www.filterheadz.com

Filterheadz are a techno DJ and production duo from Leuven, Belgium, formed by brothers Bert and Maarten Wilmaers.

== History ==
In the mid-1980s, the Filterheadz made their first musical steps by playing in a pop band. Bert played guitar, Maarten was a drummer. Their role models were bands such as U2, The Police and Simple Minds, whose influences are still audible in their songs even today.

After various pop, rock, metal, and R&B projects with modest success, they continuously approached the field of electronic dance music through remixes by Roger Sanchez, Masters at Work, and David Morales. Their recent productions are oriented towards the American House scene.

In 1998, they were contracted by the Belgian label Headroom Music. After a few publications under various pseudonyms, they decided to opt for the name "Filterheadz". At that time, Jo Casters' attention was raised and he ordered a number of remixes from them. Their interpretation of "Struggle for Pleasure" (Minimalistix) became a club hit. Inspired by Deep Dish and John Digweed, they advanced to progressive trance and with remixes for Hooj and Platypus scored more club hits.

When the Filterheadz were contacted by Intec Records, they produced a Latin Techno track "Sunshine", which was to be played on Ibiza as a summer song. More remix work for Green Velvet, Bedrock, Eddie Amador, Tiësto and Oliver Lieb followed.

After producing the best-selling techno record of the year, they began to search musical diversity again and published their first mixed genre CD "Tribalicious". The first album is in progress and will be a mixture of Electronic Music and Independent.

== Discography ==
=== Singles ===
- 2000 – 'Party With You' (as Slow)
- 2000 – 'Feel Your Body' (as TFF)
- 2001 – 'Faggots and Dope'
- 2001 – 'The Music'
- 2002 – 'The One Who Got Caught'
- 2002 – 'The Rhythm/Protection' (feat. Tomaz)
- 2002 – 'I Love Techno (United As One)' (as Tomaz vs. Filterheadz)
- 2002 – 'I Love Sunshine' (as Tomaz vs. Filterheadz)
- 2003 – 'In Your Eyes' with Orange 3
- 2003 – 'Lake T'ana' (as Slow)
- 2003 – 'Tribalicious'
- 2003 – 'Corridor' (as Zzino vs. Filterheadz)
- 2004 – 'Yimanya'
- 2005 – 'Love Distortion'
- 2005 – 'Cartagena/Santiago/Lima'
- 2005 – 'Switch'
- 2006 – 'Endless Summer'
- 2006 – 'Blue Sky Happiness'
- 2008 – 'Day At the Beach'
- 2009 – 'Rising Rocky'
- 2011 – 'Everything Explained'
- 2012 – 'The Game'
- 2012 – 'Earth'
- 2013 – 'Atlantic'
- 2013 – 'This And That'

=== Remixes ===
- 1999 – After Sun – "Lovers"
- 2000 – Spectre – "Intoxification" (Pro–Sync v. Filterheadz)
- 2000 – Eggs & Bacon – "Moonlight Shining"
- 2000 – Minimalistix – "Struggle for Pleasure"
- 2000 – Master & Slave – "Time of Your Life"
- 2001 – Star – "Rock Rose"
- 2001 – Minimalistix – "Close Cover/Close But Undercover"
- 2001 – Ashtrax – "Digital Reason"
- 2001 – Murcielago – "Los Americanos"
- 2001 – Minimalistix – "Into the Trees"
- 2001 – Sonorous – "Glass Garden"
- 2001 – Miss K. vs. Woody Rivers – "Touched Together" (Filterheadz vs. Pro–Sync Remix)
- 2001 – Dave Kane – "The Journey of Zoé"
- 2001 – Minimalistix – Firewalkers
- 2001 – DJ Sandy vs. Sinesweeper – "Shake It"
- 2002 – Antiloop – "Start Rockin'"
- 2002 – Minimalistix – "Into the Streets"
- 2002 – Praga Khan – "Glamour Girl"
- 2002 – Bedrock – "Emerald"
- 2002 – Ralphie B – "Massive"
- 2002 – DJ Georgio presents Scramjet – "Into Tha Groove"
- 2002 – Sylver – "Livin' My Life"
- 2002 – Tiesto & Junkie XL – "Obsession"
- 2002 – Barraka – "Song To The Siren"
- 2002 – Oliver Lieb – "Subsonik"
- 2002 – Richi M – "Face the Future"
- 2002 – QED – "Hardly A Day"
- 2003 – Minimalistix – "Magic Fly"
- 2003 – Roc Project feat. Tina Arena – "Never"
- 2003 – Roc Project feat. Tina Arena – "Never" (Tiësto Remix vs. Filterheadz Remix)
- 2003 – Ashtrax – "Digital Reason"
- 2003 – Air Bureau – "Coloured Reasons"
- 2003 – Whatever, Girl! – "Activator (You Need Some)"
- 2003 – Pierre Ravan & Safar – "Divine Energy"
- 2003 – Eddie Amador – "House Music"
- 2003 – DJ Preach – "Against Winter (Filterheadz Re–work)"
- 2003 – Dallas Superstars – "I Feel Love"
- 2003 – Kira – "I'll Be Your Angel"
- 2003 – Robbie Rivera – "Sex"
- 2003 – Vek – "Can't Get It"
- 2003 – The Attic – "I Just Can't Help It"
- 2004 – Eric Prydz – "Call On Me"
- 2004 – Faithless – "I Want More"
- 2004 – Dido – "Sand In My Shoes"
- 2004 – Delerium feat. Sarah McLachlan – "Silence"
- 2004 – Tranquility Base – "Surrender"
- 2005 – Housetrap – "Freak"
- 2005 – End–Jy – "Tango"
- 2006 – Marcel Woods – "Advanced"
- 2006 – Steve Porter – "1990"
- 2006 – Tom Tom Le Chevalier & Anita Kelsey – "Never Ever"
- 2006 – Johan Gielen – "Revelations"
- 2006 – M.I.K.E. – "Strange World 2006"
- 2007 – Regi – "I Fail"
- 2007 – Michal Poliak – "World Republic"
- 2007 – Minimalistix – "Whistling Drive (Aka Young Folks)"
- 2008 – Schossow* & Sagstad – "Svamptramp"
- 2008 – Sia – "Buttons"
- 2008 – Boss@Nova – "I Wanna Be Your Dog"
- 2008 – Chainside – "I Would Die For You"
- 2008 – O.C. – "The Sleep Routine D.P."
- 2008 – Simon Patterson – "Different Feeling"
- 2009 – Marco Bailey – "Muzika"
- 2014 – Dimitri Vegas & Like Mike – "CHATTEHOOCHEE"
