= Can't Make Up My Mind =

Can't Make Up My Mind may refer to:

- "Can't Make Up My Mind" (Sonique song)
- "I Can't Make Up My Mind", a song by The Zombies
- "Can't Make Up My Mind", a song by The Seekers
- "Can't Make Up My Mind", a song by John Gorka from Between Five and Seven
