= Born to Be Free (Sonique album) =

Studio album by Sonique
- Released: 20 May 2003
- Recorded: 2002–2003
- Genre: Dance-pop
- Label: UMVD

Sonique chronology
Club Mix (2001)	Born to Be Free (2003)	On Kosmo (2005)

Professional ratings
Review scores
Source	Rating
AllMusic	3.5/5 stars

Born to Be Free is an album released by the British DJ and singer Sonique in 2003. The album contains the singles "Alive" and "Can't Make Up My Mind".

Lacking promotion, the album reached number 142 on the UK Albums Chart and remains uncertified; this was seen as a disappointment given the success of Sonique's platinum-selling previous album, Hear My Cry, which reached number 6.

== Track listing ==
1. "Alive"
2. "Hold Me Now"
3. "Can't Make Up My Mind"
4. "Magic"
5. "Love Washes Away"
6. "Will You Want Me"
7. "Freefalling (Mum's Favourite)"
8. "Right Here You an' I"
9. "Seriously"
10. "You're the Reason"
11. "Born to Be Free"
12. "Please"
13. "I'm Gonna Love You"
14. "Can't Make Up My Mind" (Sonique Beatmix)

== Charts ==
Chart performance for Born to Be Free
Chart (2003)	Peak position
German Albums (Offizielle Top 100)	97
UK Albums (OCC)	142
