= Accident in Paradise =

Studio album by Sven Väth
- Released: 1992
- Genre: Ambient, trance, ambient techno
- Length: 66:52
- Label: Eye Q/WEA Records; 4509-93989 Warner Bros. Records (United States); 45442
- Producer: Sven Väth; Ralf Hildenbeutel

Sven Väth chronology
Accident in Paradise (1992)	The Harlequin, the Robot, and the Ballet-Dancer (1994)

Alternative cover
- US version

Professional ratings
Review scores
Source	Rating
AllMusic	4.5/5 stars
NME	9/10
Select	4/5 medals

Accident in Paradise is the debut album of DJ and producer Sven Väth. It was originally released in 1992 by Eye-Q, a German record label that Väth co-founded. A re-release in 1993 featured two bonus tracks. A remix CD was also released in 1993, featuring remixes by Spicelab, Spooky and William Orbit. In 1995 Mixmag rated An Accident in Paradise one of the top-50 dance albums of all time. The most popular songs on the album are the title track and "L'Esperanza," which were both played in clubs during the 1990s and were remixed several times.

Although the title track is a fast techno piece, several other songs are far more sedate, as Väth experimented with a variety of ambient and ethnic sounds. For instance, "Merry-Go-Round Somewhere" is an entirely ambient piece of merry-go-round sounds. The track "Sleeping Invention" features sounds of the deep forest accompanied with bass drums and harpsichord. The track "Coda" is especially minimalist, using only a flute and a harpsichord.

== Track listing ==
1992 Album
No.	Title	Length
1.	"Ritual of Life"	13:08
2.	"Caravan of Emotions"	12:28
3.	"L'Esperanza"	10:25
4.	"Sleeping Invention"	3:20
5.	"Mellow Illusion"	9:10
6.	"Merry-Go-Round Somewhere"	1:27
7.	"An Accident in Paradise"	6:24
8.	"Drifting Like Whales in the Darkness"	6:42
9.	"Coda"	1:23

1993 re-issue bonus tracks
No.	Title	Length
10.	"L'Esperanza (Single Edit)"	3:45
11.	"Ritual of Life (The Tribal Acid Mix)" (remixed by Ralf Hildenbeutel)	8:31
