= Voice FM 103.9 =

Radio station in Southampton, England

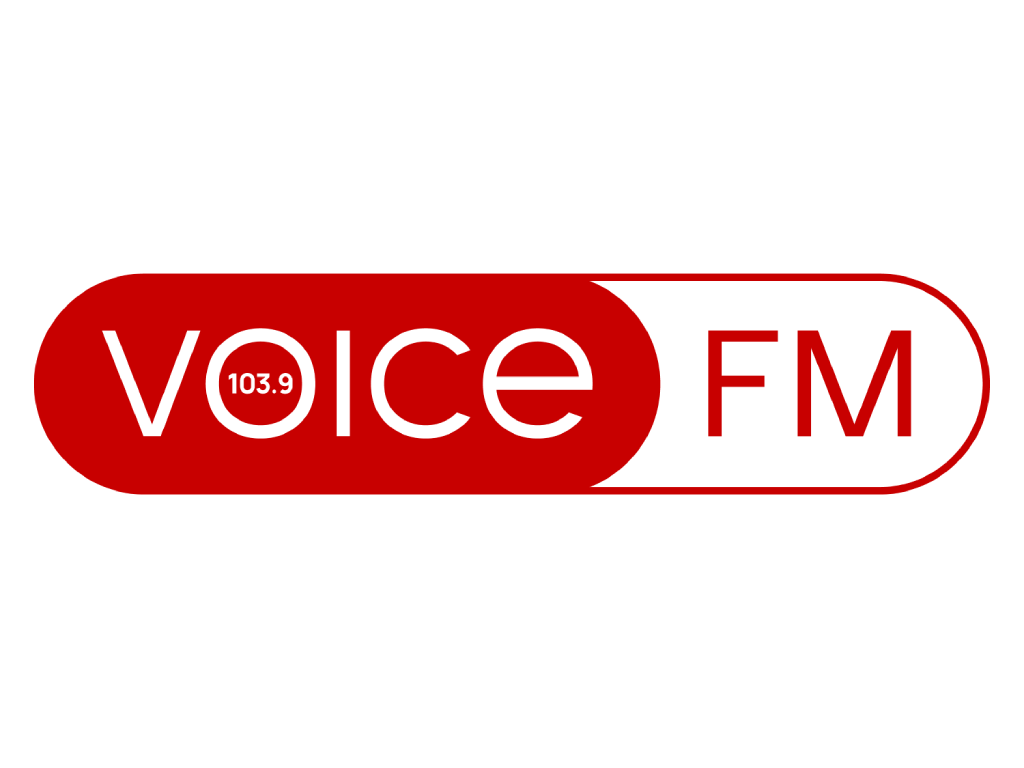

Voice FM is a Community Radio Station that covers Southampton, England, and surrounding areas. Their main audience is students, playing contemporary hit radio, as well as showcasing homegrown talent.

== Schedule ==
The schedule for Voice FM begins with the breakfast show each day between 7 a.m. and 10 a.m. (8–10 a.m. on weekends), followed by the mid-morning show between 10 a.m. and 12 p.m., and the Drive time show from 4 p.m.

From 6 p.m., the shows turn specialist and move away from the contemporary pop. Within these hours the genres range from soul music to classic rock. Notable specialist shows include the Decades of Dance show, the Soul Train with Don Jon and the nightly Club Mix sessions.

The breakfast show features that week's playlist, as well as two "fresh" tracks and the "homegrown hit". The DriveTime Show follows the same format, but with more of an emphasis on street music. The mid-morning show continues to play the most popular chart favourites along with features such as The Birthday File, the Brainbuster and On This Day In History. On The Saturday Breakfast Show presenters attempt to break World records and mock the "contemporary" playlist with their own "Guilty Pleasure of the Week" segment.

== Notable presenters ==
- Ferry Corsten – Corsten's Countdown
