= Cygnus X (group) =

German trance music project

- Genres: Progressive trance, classic trance
- Years active: 1993–2005
- Labels: Eye Q Records
- Past members: Matthias Hoffmann; Ralf Hildenbeutel

Cygnus X was a trance music project from Germany named after the X-ray binary star Cygnus X-1. It began as a collaboration between Matthias Hoffmann and Ralf Hildenbeutel, who later left. Other projects of the pair include A.C. Boutsen, Brainchild and Dee.FX. Their sound extends from hard to ambient trance.

Their first release was "Superstring" in 1993. "The Orange Theme", released in 1994, was the project's best received track: a trance version of Henry Purcell's "Music for the Funeral of Queen Mary," better known as the title theme of the film A Clockwork Orange. Their releases "Positron" and "Hypermetrical" became also well known hits of the genre.

Several years later, "The Orange Theme" and "Superstring" were given new remixes and became chart hits. The Bervoets & De Goeij remix of "The Orange Theme" charted at #43 in the UK Singles Chart in March 2000, followed by the Rank 1 remix of "Superstring" charting at #33 in August 2001.

== Discography ==
=== Album ===
Hypermetrical - (1995)
No.	Title	Length
1.	"Kinderlied" (part 1)	2:24
2.	"Kinderlied" (part 2)	9:08
3.	"Hypermetrical"	5:38
4.	"Deliberation"	12:09
5.	"Turn Around"	10:06
6.	"Synchronism"	10:00
7.	"The Orange Theme" (remix)	8:29
8.	"Indakasa"	7:23
Total length:		65:17

=== Compilation albums ===
- "Collected Works" (2003)

=== Singles ===
- "Superstring" (1993) - UK #33 in 2001
- "Positron" (1993)
- "The Orange Theme" (1994) - UK #43 in 2000
- "Kinderlied" (1995)
- "Turn Around" (1995)
- "Synchronism" (1995)
- "Hypermetrical" (1995)

=== Remixes ===
- MIR - "Under The Milkyway" (1996)
- Baby Fox - "Baby Fox" - Rain (1997)
- Art of Trance - "Madagascar" (1998)
- Art of Trance - "Breathe" (1999)
- Art of Trance - "Easter Island" (1999)
