= Industrie und Melodie =

Studio album by Cosmic Baby
- Released: December 2006
- Recorded: November 1997 – January 1999
- Genre: Techno, electro, industrial, IDM, house, chill-out, ambient, breakbeat, electronica
- Length: 58:09
- Label: Time Out of Mind Records

Cosmic Baby chronology
Die Toteninsel (2006)	Industrie und Melodie (2006)	Caged (2007)

Industrie und Melodie is in all the sixth studio album by Cosmic Baby and his fifth under that pseudonym. The title is German for "industry and melody".

The album was recorded between 1997 and 1999, when it had the working title Rotes Quadrat auf Schwarzem Grund (Red Square on a Black Background). Originally planned for release in 2000, it was in the end only released in December 2006, under its current title. Around the same time as Industrie und Melodie the much more ambitious Heaven album was recorded.

Industrie und Melodie makes use of analog synthesizers from the 1970s and was influenced by electronic artists active in that period, such as Kraftwerk, Tangerine Dream and Vangelis, but also by more contemporary artists such as Autechre, Aphex Twin and Orbital. The album differs from most of the other works by Cosmic Baby in that the music is more playful and experimental, in the lines of 1996's Fourteen Pieces (although Industrie und Melodie is more minimalistic in its arrangements and has an overall darker atmosphere). Furthermore, the digital piano sound typical for Cosmic Baby is not heard in it.

== Poem ==
In both the title track (which is obviously Kraftwerk-influenced, being similar in sounds and structure to Kraftwerk's song "Pocket Calculator" from the album Computer World) and the track "Maschinengeschichten II" a poem in German can be heard, spoken through a vocoder (rhythmic and spread over some passages in the former; it is brought more ominously in the latter). This poem is found in the CD booklet and goes as follows:

Ein Luxusgut für jedermann.
Ein Auto und TV-Programm.

Pauschalurlaub, Erlebnisraum.
Per Joystick in den Cyber-Traum.

Ein Film beschreibt die Wirklichkeit
In digitaler Natürlichkeit.

Vollkommen ist die Illusion,
Durch Marketing in Perfektion.

Unsichtbare Energien,
Austauschbare Strategien.

Schönheit, Lust: berechenbar.
Alle Träume werden wahr.

Free translation (from Cosmic Baby's official website):

A luxury for every woman and man.
A car and a TV programme.

Package holiday, adventure.
Via joystick into cyber nature.

A film describes reality
In digital fidelity.

The illusion is complete,
Marketed to perfection.

Invisible energies,
Interchangeable strategies.

Beauty, desire are calculable.
All your dreams easily realizable.

Some other phrases and words through vocoder are also heard throughout the album.

== Track listing ==
No.	Title	Length
1.	"Experienced Coincidences"	5:45
2.	"Kleine Eisenbahn Fährt ins Wunderland"	4:26
3.	"Brigade der Zeitroboter"	5:48
4.	"Maschinengeschichten I"	2:48
5.	"Die Reise Durch den Süden"	3:33
6.	"Im Aquarium"	6:43
7.	"Industrie & Melodie"	4:36
8.	"Ostkreuz"	2:04
9.	"Spieltanz — Triadisches Ballet"	4:44
10.	"Schlecht Geschlafen"	2:18
11.	"Wolfgang Pauli im Experimentallabor"	5:16
12.	"Maschinengeschichten II"	1:28
13.	"Sowjetunion"	3:37
14.	"Kleine Feine Traumschleife"	4:55
