= Café del Mar (song) =

Single by Energy 52

Single by Energy 52
- Released: 1993
- Genre: Trance
- Length: 7:16 (original mix)
- Label: Eye Q Records EYE Q 001
- Songwriters: Paul Schmitz-Moormann and Harald Blüchel

"Café del Mar" is a song first released in 1993 by the trance project Energy 52. It is named after the famous bar located in Ibiza, Balearic Islands, Spain. Almost instantly recognisable by its distinct melody, its popularity is reflected in the countless remixes that have since been created as well as its being featured on hundreds of CD compilations. The main melody of "Café del Mar" is based on "Struggle for Pleasure" by Belgian composer Wim Mertens.

The song has charted two times on the UK Singles Chart, with both releases featuring remixes by Three 'N One. It first made number 24 in March 1997, and a second release ("Café del Mar '98") featuring a Nalin & Kane remix reached number 12 in July 1998.

The song was included on the soundtrack to the 1999 film Human Traffic. In 2001, it was voted number one in Mixmag's "100 Best Tunes Ever" list. In 2011, it was voted number one out of fifty nominated tracks in the 'Top 20 Dance Tracks of Last 20 Years' users poll by listeners of BBC Radio 1.

== List of remixes (non-comprehensive) ==
"Café del Mar (Three 'n' One Mix)"
The 1997 Three 'n' One mix was one of the most popular of the "Café del Mar" remixes.

=== 1993 ===
No.	Title	Length
1.	"Cosmic Baby's Impression"	6:45
2.	"Kid Paul Mix (a.k.a. Original Mix)"	7:16
3.	"Peace Mix"	7:13
4.	"Porte de Bagnolet Mix"	5:53

=== 1997 ===
No.	Title	Length
1.	"Ivan Remix"	8:06
2.	"Josh Abrahams' Down Under Remix"	7:03
3.	"Kid Paul Radio Mix"	3:32
4.	"Oliver Lieb Radio Mix 1"	3:55
5.	"Oliver Lieb Radio Mix 2"	3:40
6.	"Oliver Lieb's LSG Remix" (a.k.a. Oliver Lieb Mix 1)	7:44
7.	"Oliver Lieb Mix 2"	7:30
8.	"Solarstone Remix"	8:37
9.	"Three'n'One Radio Mix"	3:50
10.	"Three'n'One Remix"	8:43
11.	"Universal State of Mind Mix"	7:15

=== 1998 ===
No.	Title	Length
1.	"Hybrid's Time Traveller Remix"	6:36
2.	"Kinky Roland Remix"	8:22
3.	"Nalin & Kane Radio Cut"	3:57
4.	"Nalin & Kane Remix Edit"	9:16
5.	"Nalin & Kane Remix"	9:44
6.	"Three'n'One Radio Mix 2"	3:37
7.	"Three'n'One Remix"	8:15

=== 1999 ===
No.	Title	Length
1.	"Deepsky's Stateside Cannon Remix"	7:35
2.	"Kid Paul's '99 Rebuild" (not released)	7:45
3.	"Pure Nova & DJ Eyal Project Remix"	7:50

=== 2000 ===
No.	Title	Length
1.	"Humate Ambient Remix" (limited pre-release)	7:07
2.	"Michael Woods Ambient Remix" (limited pre-release)	10:26
3.	"Sonique Version 52" (bootleg with Sonique - "It Feels So Good")	8:01

=== 2002 ===
No.	Title	Length
1.	"Humate Ambient Remix Edit"	6:33
2.	"Humate Ambient Remix"	7:07
3.	"John "00" Fleming Remix"	10:07
4.	"Marco V Radio Edit"	3:08
5.	"Marco V Remix Edit"	6:58
6.	"Marco V Remix"	8:34
7.	"Michael Woods Ambient Mix Edit"	9:26
8.	"Michael Woods Ambient Mix"	10:26
9.	"Three'n'One Update Radio Edit"	3:19
10.	"Three'n'One Update"	8:55

=== 2003 ===
No.	Title	Length
1.	"Chicane Remix"	3:27

=== 2006 ===
No.	Title	Length
1.	"Raul Rincon Mix"	7:54
2.	"Raul Rincon Remix Instrumental"	7:54
3.	"Tall Paul Remix"	8:30
4.	"Soul Seekerz Remix"	7:32
5.	"K-Klass Remix"	8:53
6.	"Kenny Hayes Remix"	7:52

=== 2007 ===
No.	Title	Length
1.	"Alien Project - Activation Portal contains psytrance tracks with the "Cafe del Mar" anthem (tracks 3 "NRG" and 9 "Yellow Blaze")"
2.	"Hardino Remix"
3.	"K & H Tribute Remix"

=== 2008 ===
No.	Title	Length
1.	"Michael Woods and Marcella Woods "Out of Office" Remix"	7:42
2.	"Deadmau5 Remix"	7:34
3.	"Dabruck & Klein Remix (Bootleg)"	8:16
4.	"Asom Remix"	8:54
5.	"Whelan & Di Scala Remix"	8:20
6.	"Oliver Lang Remix"	8:13
7.	"Dave Robertson Remix"	7:37
8.	"David Puentez Bootleg Mix"	7:40
9.	"Bruckmann 2008 Remix"	8:13

=== 2011 ===
No.	Title	Length
1.	"Rigel Remix" (not released)	7:40
2.	"Ricardo Villalobos Remix"	9:30
3.	"Ricardo Villalobos Dub"	11:45
4.	"eigenspace - Cafe Del Mar (eigenspace twenty-eleven mash)"	10:05

=== 2012 ===
No.	Title	Length
1.	"Lowland (Orchestral Version)" (taken from the album Classical Trancelations by Lowland)

=== 2014 ===
No.	Title	Length
1.	"Radio Edit by Paul Oakenfold" (for Trance Mission (2014))	7:40
2.	"Liam Van Dyke - Cafe del Mar (First Class Lounge Cut)"	4:36

=== 2015 ===
No.	Title	Length
1.	"Version by Beat Service"	5:14

=== 2016 ===
No.	Title	Length
1.	"Tim Engelhardt Remix"
2.	"Mario Da Ragnio Remix"
3.	"Marcel Janovsky Remix"
4.	"Dale Middleton Remix"
5.	"Dimitri Vegas & Like Mike vs Klaas Edit (Mattn & Futuristic Polar Bears)"

=== 2018 ===
No.	Title	Length
1.	"Tale of Us (Renaissance Remix)"	8:30
2.	"David Gravell Remix"	5:00

=== 2020 ===
No.	Title	Length
1.	"Jean Carles Ferrer "2020" Remix"	7:48

=== 2021 ===
No.	Title	Length
1.	"Paul van Dyk Xoxo Remix"
2.	"Paul van Dyk SHINE Remix"

=== 2022 ===
No.	Title	Length
1.	"Cover by Dimitri Vegas & Like Mike vs. Vini Vici vs. MATTN"
2.	"Binary Finary Remix"

=== 2024 ===
- Michael Mayer Remix
- Orbital Remix
- REZarin Remix

== Certifications ==
Region	Certification	Certified units/sales
United Kingdom (BPI)	Gold	400,000^{‡}
^{‡} Sales+streaming figures based on certification alone.
