= Stellar Supreme =

Studio album by Cosmic Baby
- Released: 1992
- Genres: Techno, trance, house, chill-out, electro
- Length: 77:05
- Labels: MFS; Logic Records; Time Out of Mind Records

Cosmic Baby chronology
Stellar Supreme (1992)	Thinking About Myself (1994)

Professional ratings
Review scores
Source	Rating
AllMusic	2.5/5 stars

Stellar Supreme is a music album by techno/trance artist Cosmic Baby. It is Cosmic Baby's debut album and it was first released in late 1992 on the MFS label.

== Track listing ==
No.	Title	Length
1.	"The Space Track"	8:37
2.	"Stimme der Energie"	6:26
3.	"Stellar Supreme"	6:11
4.	"Heaven's Tears"	6:10
5.	"Planet Earth 1993 (Blue)"	5:48
6.	"The Pianotrack (Yellow)"	5:11
7.	"Sea of Tranquility"	3:19
8.	"Cosmikk Trigger 5.1"	1:02
9.	"Sweet Dreams for Kaa — My Love"	5:37
10.	"Studio or Spaceship"	0:51
11.	"Galaxia"	4:14
12.	"Cosmic Force"	4:56
13.	"Eurovoodoo"	6:24
14.	"Liebe (Red)"	6:44
15.	"The Universal Mind"	5:33
Total length:		77:05

== Trivia ==
- The track "Stimme der Energie" features a sample of the track of the same name by Kraftwerk from the album Radio-Aktivität (Radio-Activity) from 1975.
