= Beachball (song) =

1997 single by Nalin & Kane

Single by Nalin & Kane
- Released: 9 June 1997
- Genre: Trance; Balearic trance
- Length: 3:52
- Label: Hooj
- Songwriters: Harry Cane; Andry Nalin; Andrea Canta; Shondell Mims
- Producers: Andry Nalin; Harry Cane

Nalin & Kane singles chronology
"Vol. III" (1996)	"Beachball" (1997)	"Talkin' About" (1997)

"Beachball" is a song by German production team Nalin & Kane, released in June 1997 as a single. It reached number one on the Canadian RPM Dance chart for four weeks and reached number 10 in Germany and number 19 in Switzerland. A Tall Paul remix of the song reached number seven in Ireland and number 17 in the United Kingdom in October 1998.

== Critical reception ==
Pan-European magazine Music & Media wrote, "Bouncing onto the airwaves comes a summery helping of minimalistic trance. This German production duo have come up with a sparsely arranged and yet remarkably tuneful number. With the proper support—and the proverbial little bit of luck—Messrs Nalin and Kane should be able to emulate the massive chart success they enjoyed in their homeland a couple of months ago. In spite of their length—which undoubtedly renders them less than suitable for mainstream radio play—the selection of remixes on offer is also well worthy of further investigation."

Chris Finan from Music Week's RM Dance Update gave "Beachball" four out of five, commenting, "German duo Nalin & Kane get a run of only 2,000 copies on this release from Hooj. Chill-out trance is a simple guide to this tune—it has moody electro influences but with a steady beat which gives this an amazing flexibility as to where and when it can be played. Sometimes minimal, sometimes drifty but always mesmerising in its four mixes. The Seaside mix works best, though, featuring the greater of the hooks and probably appealing more to the mainstream than the others. Shame it's limited really."

== Impact and legacy ==
In 2018, Mixmag ranked "Beachball" among "The 15 Best Mid-90s Trance Tracks", writing that it "is as sun-soaked as it gets and tailor-made for Ibiza shores, from the track title to the lyrics about beaches and oceans. There are even bird chirps thrown into the breakdown for good measure. Proper hands in the air fare."

== Track listings ==
- CD maxi-single (Europe, 1997)
1. "Beachball" (Vocal Radio Edit) – 3:52
2. "Beachball" (Original Radio Edit) – 3:57
3. "Beachball" (Extended Vocal Mix) – 7:36
4. "Beachball" (Original Club Mix) – 10:23
5. "Beachball" (Sea Side Mix) – 8:10
- CD maxi-single Remix (Europe, 1997)
1. "Beachball" (Sharam Baywatch Remix) – 9:32
2. "Beachball" (Shahin & Simon Remix) – 5:43
3. "Beachball" (Daniel Klein & Basti Remix) – 9:51
4. "Beachball" (Tom Civic Remix) – 6:12

== Charts ==
=== Original version ===
Chart (1997–1998)	Peak position
Australia (ARIA)	78
Austria (Ö3 Austria Top 40)	31
Belgium (Ultratop 50 Flanders)	36
Canada Dance/Urban (RPM)	1
France (SNEP)	43
Germany (GfK)	10
Ireland (IRMA)	27
Italy (FIMI)	13
Netherlands (Dutch Top 40)	24
Netherlands (Single Top 100)	40
Scottish Singles Sales (Official Charts)	38
Spain Maxi-Singles (AFYVE)	1
Switzerland (Schweizer Hitparade)	19
UK Dance (Official Charts)	6
UK Singles (Official Charts)	48
US Maxi-Singles Sales (Billboard)	33

=== Remix version ===
Chart (1998)	Peak position
Ireland (IRMA)	7
Scottish Singles Sales (Official Charts)	8
UK Singles (Official Charts)	17
UK Dance (Official Charts)	1

=== Beachball 2003 version ===
Chart (2003)	Peak position
Hungary (Dance Top 40)	38

=== Year-end charts ===
Chart (1997)	Position
Germany (Media Control)	65

== Certifications ==
Region	Certification	Certified units/sales
United Kingdom (BPI)	Silver	200,000^{‡}
^{‡} Sales+streaming figures based on certification alone.
