= Harald Blüchel =

German electronic artist

- Also known as: B-Culture, Cosmic Baby, Cosmic Enterprises, Cosmic Inc., De Luxe 63, Startrek
- Born: February 19, 1966 (age 59); Nuremberg, Germany
- Genres: Electronic, techno, trance, house, chill-out, electro, IDM, Balearic beat, breakbeat, minimal techno, ambient
- Occupation(s): Record producer, songwriter, DJ, keyboardist, musician
- Years active: c.1990–present
- Labels: MFS (1991–1993); Logic Records (1993–1995); Time Out of Mind Records (1995–present)
- Website: www.haraldbluechel.de

Harald Blüchel (born February 19, 1966) is a German electronic musician who is mostly known under his alias Cosmic Baby. Blüchel is also well known for his participation in dance acts such as Energy 52 with Paul Schmitz-Moormann and the Visions of Shiva with Paul van Dyk.

== Biography and musical career ==
Blüchel was born in Nuremberg, Germany. At the age of 6, Blüchel started taking classes in classical piano. He began studying at the Hochschule für Musik Nürnberg one year later. His favourite composers soon were, amongst others, Béla Bartók and Igor Stravinsky. In 1976, he discovered electronic music and took an interest in playing the synthesizer. At the time he was listening to bands such as Kraftwerk and Tangerine Dream. Blüchel continued his studies in music. In 1986 he moved to West Berlin and entered into Technische Universität Berlin to study audio engineering, and also entered into the Berlin University of the Arts to study composition. While living in Berlin, he met producer Kid Paul. In 1988 he started to compose and take side in techno music and house music.

In 1991, Blüchel first appeared as "Cosmic Baby" in live acts. That year he signed with trance label MFS, where he released his first album Stellar Supreme in 1992. In 1992 he also paired up with Paul van Dyk for the project "The Visions of Shiva" under which name two EPs came out, Perfect Day (1992) and How Much Can You Take? (1993). The two then later went their separate ways. In late 1993, Blüchel left MFS and signed onto Logic Records, a record label owned by BMG.

At the beginning of the 1990s, Blüchel formed Energy 52 with Kid Paul. In 1993, Energy 52 released "Café del Mar", which is considered to be a trance classic and one of the most remixed songs in electronic music. In 1994, Blüchel released his single "Loops of Infinity", which stayed in the top 30 of the German charts for three months. In April 1994 he released his second album Thinking About Myself. He later also created a soundtrack for Futura, a musical dance act. This soundtrack features some material from Thinking About Myself and was released under the name Cosmic Inc. in 1995. Another soundtrack, Musik zu Andorra, for the stageplay Andorra by Max Frisch, appeared in 1997. Blüchel decided to become a music publisher and founded Cosmic Enterprises in 1994; he then created his own label Time Out of Mind Records in 1995. The third full-length album Fourteen Pieces was released in 1996, the fourth album Heaven followed in 1999. Throughout the late 1990s, Blüchel would perform as a DJ in the United States, Mexico and other places around the world.

Blüchel later started collaborating with Christopher von Deylen. Together they released two albums as Blüchel & Von Deylen in 2004: Bi Polar and Mare Stellaris. After this, Blüchel began releasing works under his real name, more ambient-like, minimalistic and experimental than his works as Cosmic Baby. The albums that appeared in the following years were part of the "Zauberberg" ("Magic Mountain") trilogy. Meanwhile, Blüchel also made a comeback as Cosmic Baby with the release of the album Industrie und Melodie at the end of 2006.

Scooter mentions Blüchel and his Energy 52 partner, Kid Paul, in their 1994 song Hyper Hyper, during which lead singer H.P. Baxxter reads out the name of numerous DJs.

== Discography ==
As Cosmic Baby

- Stellar Supreme (1992)
- Thinking About Myself (1994)
- Fourteen Pieces — Selected Works 1995 (1996)
- Heaven (1999)
- Industrie und Melodie (2006)
- Works 1996.1 — Somnambul (2007) (for download only)
- Works 1996.2 — Hundeherz (2007) (for download only)

As Harald Blüchel

- Die Toteninsel (Zauberberg-Trilogie Teil 1) (2006)
- Caged (Zauberberg-Trilogie Teil 2) (2007)
- Electric Chamber Music (Zauberberg-Trilogie Teil 3) (2009)
- No Ordinary Moments (2020)
