= Heaven (Cosmic Baby album) =

Studio album by Cosmic Baby
- Released: 1999
- Recorded: 1998
- Genre: Techno, trance, house, chill-out, electro, Balearic beat, breakbeat
- Length: 77:19
- Label: Intercord

Cosmic Baby chronology
| Fourteen Pieces (1996) | Heaven (1999) | Die Toteninsel (2006) |

Heaven is a music album by techno/trance artist Cosmic Baby which was released in 1999. It is Cosmic Baby's fourth full-length album. It was his final album before his break from recording as Cosmic Baby, as well as his final album in traditional Cosmic Baby style. At the end of 2006, he returned as Cosmic Baby with the album Industrie und Melodie.

True to its title, the album has a rather airy and bright overall atmosphere. It feels like a concept album. The music has a typical late-nineties techno/trance sound, and also has elements of chill-out, Balearic beat, breakbeat, and electro. The track "Karma II" is a further elaboration of "Karma" from the previous album Fourteen Pieces. The track "Lucifer" is a cover version of the track of the same name by The Alan Parsons Project from the album Eve from 1979.

== Track listing ==
| No. | Title | Length |
|---|---|---|
| 1. | "Air" | 1:47 |
| 2. | "Der Flug" | 4:32 |
| 3. | "Casa del Mar" | 6:10 |
| 4. | "Würzburg" | 5:32 |
| 5. | "Good Times" | 5:48 |
| 6. | "To Another Plane" | 6:14 |
| 7. | "Suite Russe" | 1:51 |
| 8. | "Sketches in Spring" | 7:22 |
| 9. | "Lunaris" | 6:16 |
| 10. | "Joy" | 7:41 |
| 11. | "Vapeur et Piano" | 2:06 |
| 12. | "Karma II" | 7:19 |
| 13. | "Lucifer" | 7:26 |
| 14. | "Planetenmelodie" | 7:11 |
| Total length: | | 77:19 |

== Trivia ==
- A bootleg titled Age of Silence was released under the name of Jean Michel Jarre; this bootleg is in fact Heaven by Cosmic Baby.
