= Nalin & Kane =

German dance music producers

- Origin: Germany
- Genres: House, trance
- Years active: 1993–present
- Members: Andreas Bialek; Ralf Beck

Nalin & Kane is a German production and remixing team, comprising Andry Nalin (born Andreas Bialek, 14 May 1969) and Harry Kane (born Ralf Beck; 21 November 1966). Their international breakthrough came with the Ibiza anthem, "Beachball", in mid 1997.

== Biography ==
The duo began working together in 1993 as Nalin Inc. and released their first 12-inch single, "Planet Orange", in 1994. They began their own label, Superfly Records, in 1995, releasing the singles "The K-People" and "Backfire", before the turning point came with "Beachball". They have since had success with remixes of Energy 52's "Café Del Mar", Da Hool's "Meet Her at the Love Parade" and Lustral's "Everytime". In late 1999, they released their debut album, Krystal Palace.

"Beachball" was notable for topping the club charts in many countries during its time of release. Like the majority of dance releases, the track has been remixed several times but none have come close to repeating the success of the original version. A cover version by Burnette was released at the same time, leading to two versions competing for chart position.

The track "Open Your Eyes" is featured on Tiësto's In Search of Sunrise 3. The original track "Open Your Eyes" was produced by At the Villa People in 1996, in Belgium.

== Discography ==
=== Albums ===
==== Nalin & Kane ====
- 2001: The Remixes

==== Nalin I.N.C. ====
- 2002: Different Affairs

=== Singles ===
==== Nalin & Kane ====
Year	Title	Peak chart positions							
Year	Title	GER	AUS	AUT	BEL (Fl)	FRA	NLD	SWI	UK
1995	"Krazy People"	—	—	—	—	—	—	—	—
1996	"Backfire"	—	—	—	—	—	—	—	—
1996	"Vol. III"	—	—	—	—	—	—	—	—
1997	"Beachball"	10	78	31	36	43	40	19	48
1997	"Talkin' About"	85	—	—	—	—	—	—	—
1998	"Beachball" (re-release)	—	—	—	—	—	—	—	17
1999	"Live at the Crystal Palace"	—	—	—	—	—	—	—	84
1999	"Open Your Eyes"	46	—	—	— (Note: "Open Your Eyes" did not enter the Ultratop 50, but peaked at number 13 on the Ultratip chart.)	—	85	—	—
2003	"Cruising" (as N&K) (vs. Denis The Menace featuring Alex Prince)	—	—	—	—	—	34	—	—
"—" denotes releases that did not chart

==== Nalin I.N.C. ====
- 1993: "Apalusa"
- 1994: "Planet Orange"
- 1995: "Call U"
- 1996: "Condensed EP"
- 1997: "Planet Violet" - UK No. 51, Germany No. 37
- 1999: "Magic Fly"
- 2002: "Scream" - Germany No. 73
- 2002: "African Harvest"
- 2003: "Planet Violet 2003"

==== Yellow Cab ====
- 1995: "Touch Myself"
