= Why (Sonique song) =

Single by Sonique

from the album On Kosmo
- Released: 30 May 2005 (Germany)
- Genre: Pop
- Length: 3:15
- Label: BMG
- Songwriters: Sonique; Arndt Roerig; Marco Vidovic
- Producer: Tube & Berger

Sonique singles chronology
"Another World" (2004)	"Why" (2005)	"Sleezy" (2006)

"Why" is a single by British DJ and singer, Sonique. Released on CD in Germany on 30 May 2005, the track peaked at number 90.

== Track listing ==
1. "Why" (Radio Edit)
2. "Why" (Kean Sanders Remix)
3. "Why" (Tube and Berger Remix)
4. "Why" (Dinky Remix)
5. "Why" (Video)

== Charts ==
Chart performance for "Why"
Chart (2005)	Peak position
Germany (GfK)	90
