= Sky (Sonique song) =

2000 single by Sonique

Single by Sonique

from the album Hear My Cry
- Released: 19 June 2000
- Length: 4:26 (album version); 3:59 (radio edit)
- Label: Serious; Universal
- Songwriters: Rick Nowels; Sonique
- Producers: Rick Nowels; Chris Cox; Barry Harris

Sonique singles chronology
"It Feels So Good" (2000)	"Sky" (2000)	"I Put a Spell on You" (2001)

"Sky" is a song co-written and performed by British singer and DJ Sonique. It was released on 19 June 2000 as the third single from her debut studio album, Hear My Cry (2000), peaking at number two on the UK Singles Chart and number one in Croatia and Romania.

== Track listings ==
UK CD single

1. "Sky" (radio edit)
2. "Sky" (Sharam Jey remix)
3. "Sky" (The Conductor & The Cowboy remix)
4. "Sky" (video)

UK 12-inch single

A1. "Sky" (The Conductor & The Cowboy remix)
B1. "Sky" (Sharam Jey remix)
B2. "Sky" (album version)

UK cassette single

1. "Sky" (radio edit)
2. "Sky" (Sharam Jey remix)
3. "Sky" (The Conductor & The Cowboy remix)

European CD single

1. "Sky" (radio edit) – 3:59
2. "It Feels So Good" (radio edit) – 3:49

European maxi-CD single

1. "Sky" (radio edit) – 3:59
2. "Sky" (Sonique remix) – 6:25

Australian CD single

1. "Sky" (radio edit) – 3:59
2. "Sky" (Sonique remix) – 6:25
3. "Sky" (The Conductor & The Cowboy remix) – 8:13
4. "Sky" (Sharam Jey remix) – 7:40

== Charts ==
=== Weekly charts ===
Chart (2000–2001)	Peak position
Australia (ARIA)	18
Australian Dance (ARIA)	2
Austria (Ö3 Austria Top 40)	8
Belgium (Ultratop 50 Flanders)	9
Belgium (Ultratop 50 Wallonia)	28
Canada Adult Contemporary (RPM)	69
Canada Dance/Urban (RPM)	13
Croatia (HRT)	1
Europe (Eurochart Hot 100)	15
Finland (Suomen virallinen lista)	3
France (SNEP)	22
Germany (GfK)	11
Greece (IFPI)	3
Hungary (Mahasz)	2
Iceland (Íslenski Listinn Topp 40)	23
Ireland (IRMA)	10
Ireland Dance (IRMA)	6
Italy (FIMI)	3
Netherlands (Dutch Top 40)	34
Netherlands (Single Top 100)	36
New Zealand (Recorded Music NZ)	48
Norway (VG-lista)	6
Poland Airplay (Music & Media)	5
Portugal (AFP)	5
Romania (Romanian Top 100)	1
Scottish Singles Sales (Official Charts)	2
Spain (Promusicae)	2
Sweden (Sverigetopplistan)	13
Switzerland (Schweizer Hitparade)	18
UK Singles (Official Charts)	2
UK Dance (Official Charts)	5
US Dance Club Play (Billboard)	10
US Maxi-Singles Sales (Billboard)	40

Chart (2024)	Peak position
Poland (Polish Airplay Top 100)	93

=== Year-end charts ===
Chart (2000)	Position
Europe (Eurochart Hot 100)	81
Ireland (IRMA)	87
Romania (Romanian Top 100)	7
Spain (AFYVE)	20
Sweden (Hitlistan)	90
UK Singles (OCC)	70

Chart (2001)	Position
Australia (ARIA)	86
Australian Dance (ARIA)	10

== Certifications ==
Region	Certification	Certified units/sales
Australia (ARIA)	Gold	35,000^{^}
United Kingdom (BPI)	Silver	200,000^{^}
^{^} Shipments figures based on certification alone.

== Release history ==
Region	Date	Format(s)	Label(s)	Ref(s).
United States	19 June 2000	Hot adult contemporary radio	Republic; Universal	
United States	20 June 2000	Rhythmic contemporary; contemporary hit radio	Republic; Universal	
United Kingdom	4 September 2000	12-inch vinyl; CD; cassette	Serious; Universal	
