= Alive (Sonique song) =

Single by Sonique

from the album Born to Be Free
- Released: 01 September 2003 (UK)
- Recorded: 2003
- Genre: Pop
- Label: UMVD
- Songwriters: Dave James; Lee Bennett; Alan Ross

Sonique singles chronology
"Can't Make Up My Mind" (2003)	"Alive" (2003)	"Another World" (2004)

"Alive" is a song by DJ/singer Sonique, released in September 2003. The track reached number 70 in the UK, spending one week in the Top 75 Singles Chart.

== Track listings ==
1. "Alive" (Album Version)
2. "Alive" (Benny Benassi Sfaction Club Mix)
3. "Alive" (Tomcraft Remix Edit)
4. "Alive" (Yomanda Remix Edit)
5. "Alive" (Video)

== Charts ==
Chart (2003–2004)	Peak position
Austria (Ö3 Austria Top 40)	33
Germany (GfK)	39
Hungary (Editors' Choice Top 40)	38
Poland (Polish Airplay Chart)	5
Switzerland (Schweizer Hitparade)	80
United Kingdom (The Official Charts Company)	70
