= Another World (Sonique song) =

Single by Sonique and Tomcraft

from the album On Kosmo
- Released: 13 December 2004 (Germany only)
- Recorded: 2004
- Genre: Electronic
- Length: 3:45
- Label: BMG
- Songwriters: Eniac, Sonique

Sonique singles chronology
"Alive" (2003)	"Another World" (2004)	"Why" (2005)

Tomcraft singles chronology
"Great Stuff" (2003)	"Another World" (2004)	"Dirty Sanchez" (2005)

"Another World" is the first single by British DJ and singer Sonique to be released from her On Kosmo album. Released as a CD single in Austria, Germany and Switzerland on 13 December 2004, the track peaked at number 57 in Germany.

The track was a collaboration with German producer and DJ Tomcraft, and was a major success in the nightclub scene. The song was released under the artist name "Sonique on Tomcraft".

The song was licensed by Samsung around 2008 to appear on its mobile phone software suite Samsung PC Suite. The entire song in MP3 format, and the video clip, in various resolutions, were available to copy on the mobile phones.

== Music video ==
The music video for the song was produced by Designliga (Design League) of Munich. Backgrounds and many other elements are computer-generated static (stationary) and motion graphics, some reminiscent of the movie Tron. Live-action shots of Sonique and her pursuer (who was multiplied into several through graphics) were done in front of a green screen, and composited with the CGI backgrounds.

== Track listing ==
"Another World" is a remix CD single containing five versions of the song:

1. "Another World" (Video edit)
2. "Another World" (Club radio edit)
3. "Another World" (Extended club mix)
4. "Another World" (Matthew Bradley presents Mashtronic Remix)
5. "Another World" (Video)

== Charts ==
Chart performance for "Another World"
Chart (2004)	Peak position
Austria (Ö3 Austria Top 40)	75
Germany (GfK)	57
