= Electrica Salsa =

- French 7" single

Single by OFF (Sven Väth, Luca Anzilotti & Michael Münzing)

from the album Organization for Fun
- B-side: "Remix"
- Released: 1986
- Genre: Dance-pop
- Length: 3:35 (7"); 5:48 (12"); 4:51 (Music Video)
- Label: ZYX, Flea Records, Clever, Sonet, Sakkaris, Blanco Y Negro
- Songwriter(s): Luca Anzilotti, Michael Münzing (music)
- Producer(s): Oliver Büttner

OFF (Sven Väth, Luca Anzilotti & Michael Münzing) singles chronology
"Bad News" (1985)	"Electrica Salsa" (1986)	"Step by step" (1987)

"Electrica Salsa", also titled "Electrica Salsa (Baba Baba)", is a 1986 song by the group Off, featuring German DJ and singer Sven Väth and future Snap! producers Michael Münzing and Luca Anzilotti. It was the first single from his album Organisation for Fun on which it appears as fourth track in its single version and as 14th track in the PWL remix. The song achieved success in many countries, including France, Austria, Greece and Germany, where it was a top three hit. The song was a hit particularly on the dance floors where it was much aired. A new remixed version was available on OFF's next single, "Step by Step".

== Critical reception ==
A review in Pan-European magazine Music & Media described "Electrica Salsa" like this: "One simple idea is pushed forward to its extremes and in the end become either a novelty or simply boring. This record has both qualities and exploits the musical concepts of Kraftwerk and Trio. With its danceable electro beat and the computer/vocal gimmicks, a definite Euro cross-over hit".

== Chart performance ==
"Electrica Salsa" was a major hit on the European chart. It was a top three hit in Off's home-country, Germany, where it charted for 20 weeks, 13 of them in the top 20, and peaked at number three in France where it ranked for 22 weeks, the half of them in the top ten, and received a Silver disc awarded by the Syndicat National de l'Édition Phonographique. In addition to reach number one in Italy and number three in Greece, it was a top two hit in Austria and a top five hit in the Flanders region of Belgium. It was less successful in Switzerland where it missed the top 20 by three places, the Netherlands where it stalled under the top 30, and especially in the UK where it reached number 86 in a six-week chart run divided into two segments shared in August 1987 and May 1988. On the Music & Media's Pan-Eurochart Hot 100 Singles chart, it started at number 89 on 24 January 1987, peaked at number four in its 13th week, and left the chart after 26 weeks of presence, becoming the 20th best-selling single of 1987 in Europe.

== Track listings ==
7" single - France, Sweden

1. "Electrica Salsa (Baba Baba)" — 3:35
2. "Electrica Salsa (Baba Baba)" (dub version) — 3:36

12" maxi

1 - Germany, Spain

1. "Electrica Salsa (Baba Baba)" (maxi version) — 5:48
2. "Electrica Salsa" (dub version) — 5:50

2 - Germany

1. "Electrica Salsa" (salsa inferno) — 6:22
2. "Electrica Salsa" (instrumental inferno) — 4:57

3 - Germany

1. "Electrica Salsa" (the mad house mix) — 7:06
2. "Electrica Salsa (Baba Baba)" — 5:48

Italy, France

1. "Electrica Salsa (Baba Baba)" (remix) — 6:22
2. "Electrica Salsa (Baba Baba)" (vocal version) — 5:48

UK

1. "Electrica Salsa" (PWL mix) — 7:06
2. "Electrica Salsa (Baba Baba)" (dub version) — 5:50

3" CD maxi - Germany

1. "Electrica Salsa (Baba Baba)" — 5:48
2. "Electrica Salsa (Baba Baba)" (dub version) — 5:50
3. "Step by Step" (vocal mix) — 5:55

CD maxi - 1989, Germany

1. "Electrica Salsa (Baba Baba)" — 5:48
2. "Step By Step" (vocal mix) — 5:55
3. "Time Operator" (real time mix) — 5:39

12" maxi - 1993, Italy

1. "Electrica Salsa (Baba Baba)" (Martini club remix) — 5:25
2. "Electrica Salsa (Baba Baba)" (Martini cut remix) — 5:05
3. "Electrica Salsa (Baba Baba)" (instrumental remix) — 5:25
4. "Electrica Salsa (Baba Baba)" (original version) — 5:50

== Credits ==
- Produced by O. Büttner
- Executive producers : S. Väth / L. Anzilotti / M. Münzing
- Music: M. Münzing
- Written: L. Anzilotti
- Mixed by M. Münzing / L. Anzilotti
- Recorded at Master Studios (W. Germany)
- "The mad house mix" mixed by Mixmaster Pete Hammond

== Charts ==
=== Weekly charts ===
Weekly chart performance for "Electrica Salsa"
Chart (1986–87)	Peak position
Austria (Ö3 Austria Top 40)	2
Belgium (Ultratop 50 Flanders)	5
Europe (Eurochart Hot 100)	4
France (SNEP)	3
Greece (IFPI)	3
Italy (Musica e dischi)	1
Netherlands (Dutch Top 40)	37
Netherlands (Single Top 100)	31
Switzerland (Schweizer Hitparade)	23
UK Singles (OCC)	86
UK Dance (Music Week)	40
West Germany (GfK)	3

=== Year-end charts ===
1987 year-end chart performance for "Electrica Salsa"
Chart (1987)	Peak position
Austria (Ö3 Austria Top 40)	12
Belgium (Ultratop 50 Flanders)	65
Europe (European Hot 100)	20
France (SNEP)	26
Greece (IFPI)	4
West Germany (Official German Charts)	17

== Certifications ==
Certifications for "Electrica Salsa"
Region	Certification	Certified units/sales
France (SNEP)	Silver	250,000^{*}
^{*} Sales figures based on certification alone.
