= Fourteen Pieces =

Fourteen Pieces: Selected Works 1995

Studio album by Cosmic Baby
- Released: May 27, 1996
- Recorded: 1995
- Genre: Techno, chill-out, Balearic beat, breakbeat, ambient, electro, IDM, house, trance
- Length: 97:08
- Label: Time Out of Mind Records

Cosmic Baby chronology
Thinking About Myself (1994)	Fourteen Pieces: Selected Works 1995 (1996)	Heaven (1999)

Professional ratings
Review scores
Source	Rating
AllMusic	3/5 stars

Fourteen Pieces: Selected Works 1995 is a music album by techno/trance artist Cosmic Baby, which was released internationally on 27 May 1996. It is Cosmic Baby's third full-length album. It was released as a double CD with seven tracks on each CD ("fourteen pieces" in total). The album is of a slightly more experimental and improvisational nature than its predecessors.

== Track listing ==
Disc 1
No.	Title	Length
1.	"Both Sides of the Atlantic"	8:09
2.	"East Houston St."	6:12
3.	"Teotihuacan"	5:30
4.	"Glücksspirale"	6:15
5.	"You Are Always in My Heart"	11:28
6.	"It Will Ring Your Bell"	11:44
7.	"Funkfiction I"	4:02
Total length:		53:20

Disc 2
No.	Title	Length
1.	"Karma"	3:32
2.	"Funkfiction II"	8:48
3.	"Do Not Stack"	5:30
4.	"Memories"	5:44
5.	"Yalda's Song"	5:11
6.	"Irregular Heartbeats"	8:21
7.	"Träume"	6:42
Total length:		43:48
