= Sonique (musician) =

English singer (born 1965

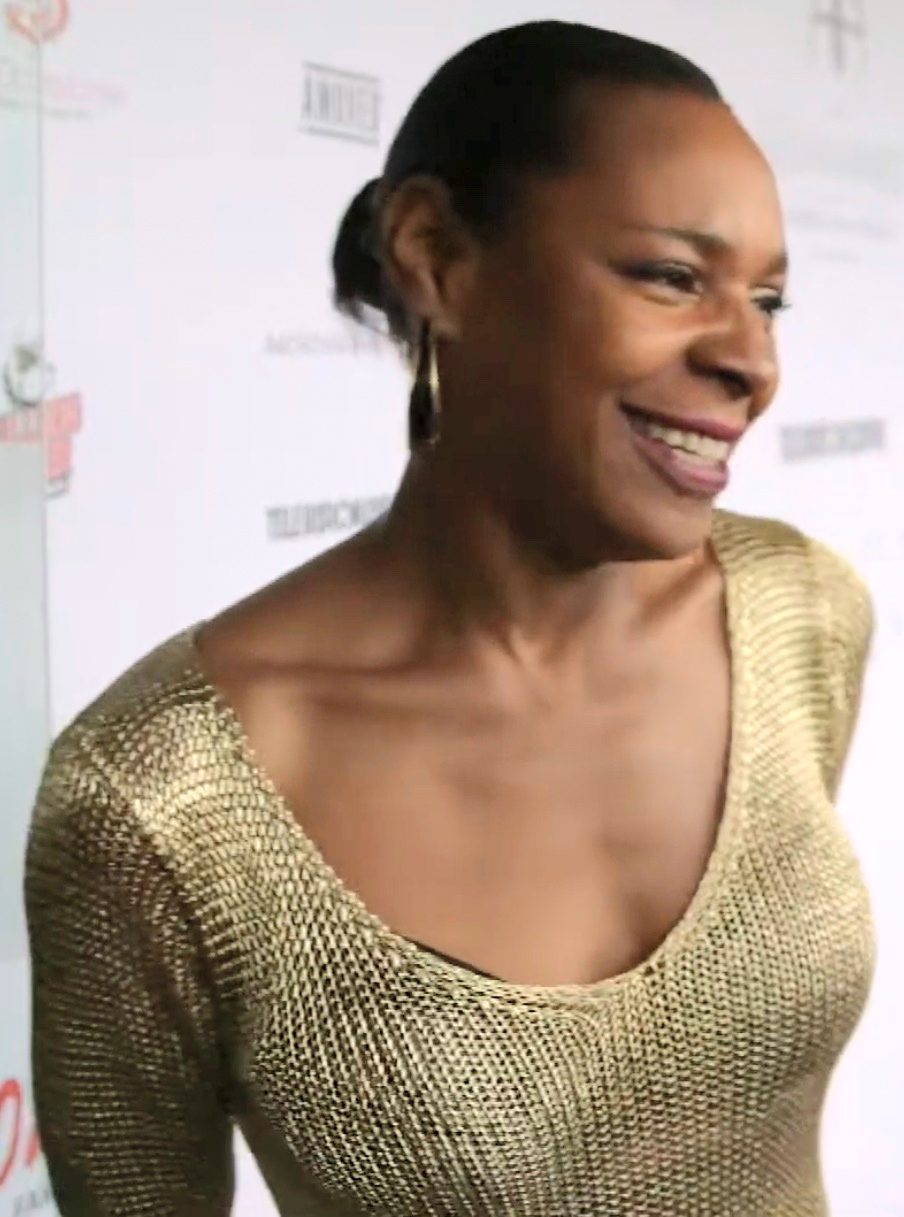
- Sonique at the 7th Asian Awards in 2017

Background information
- Also known as: Sonique
- Born: Sonia Marina Clarke; 21 June 1965 (age 61); Crouch End, North London, England
- Genres: House; Eurodance; trance
- Occupations: Singer; musician; DJ
- Instruments: Vocals; synthesiser
- Years active: 1985–present
- Labels: Universal; Serious; Caffeine
- Website: soniqueclarke.com

Sonia Marina Clarke (born 21 June 1965), better known by her stage name Sonique, is an English singer, musician and DJ. She came to public attention as a member of dance band S'Express during the early 1990s, but achieved greater success as a solo artist in the early-to mid 2000s. During this period, she achieved UK top 20 hits with "It Feels So Good", "Sky", "I Put a Spell on You" and "Can't Make Up My Mind", and won the 2001 BRIT Award for British female solo artist.

== Early life ==
Clarke was born and raised in Crouch End to parents of Trinidadian descent. The first record she ever purchased was Donna Summer's "I Feel Love". When Sonique was sixteen, her mother remarried and moved back to Trinidad. She refused to move with her mother and two siblings and instead stayed in London, moving into the YMCA.

== Early music career ==
At the age of seventeen, a youth worker commented that she had a nice voice and suggested she use it. She put together a reggae band called 'Fari', in which she ended up writing all the music. After Fari disbanded she set about getting a recording contract.

Sonique released the single "Let Me Hold You", published by Cooltempo, in 1985. The single hit the top 40 on the UK Dance Chart.

In 1990, she was credited for the track "Zombie Mantra", which was included on the album Set the Controls for the Heart of the Bass, the debut record of William Orbit's project Bass-O-Matic. Soon after, she teamed again with DJ Mark Moore, a few years after providing vocals for S'Express. The dance-pop duo charted on the UK Singles Chart with singles such as "Nothing to Lose". She maintained a friendship with Mark Moore after S'Express disbanded and, shortly afterwards, he gave her the gift of a set of turntables and a mixer with which she began experimenting.

== DJ career ==
For three years, she accompanied both Mark Moore and her childhood friend Judge Jules to their gigs. She eventually signed to London-based label Serious Records, where her first single was "I Put a Spell on You" produced by Chris Allen and ex-Wang Chung keyboardist Graeme Pleeth. She was DJ-in-residence at Club Manumission in Ibiza between 1997 and 1999.

In 1998, she came to the attention of UK promoters/label Fantazia and was asked to mix one of the discs on their album Fantazia British Anthems Summertime. The album was certified gold in the UK.

Sonique released her debut solo album, Hear My Cry, in 1998. Re-released in 2000, the album's hit single "It Feels So Good" topped the UK Singles Chart for three weeks in May/June of that year. After 14 weeks in the Top 40, it became the UK's third best-selling single of 2000. In 2001, after the success of "It Feels So Good" she announced that she planned to retire from the world of DJing to focus on her singing career. After finishing the album Born to Be Free, Sonique did return to DJing on a few special occasions.

=== 2002–2006: On Kosmo ===
In 2004, Sonique announced she was working on an album called On Kosmo. The first single was "Another World", which reached number 57 in Germany when released in 2004. "Why" (released Spring 2005), reached number 90 in Germany.

"Alone" was selected as the third single with which the album would be launched, but when the album got pushed back from the expected release date of February 2006, the single was cancelled. When the new release date of 29 September 2006 was announced, the track "Sleezy" was chosen as the single with which the album was to be released. However, "Sleezy" was also cancelled when the release date was pushed back once again. When On Kosmo was finally released, on Monday 13 November 2006, it failed to chart significantly in the UK. Nevertheless, Sonique was shown as a celebrity guest at 2006 edition of the World Music Awards, in London.

=== 2007–2011 ===
In 2007, when promotional work for her previous album, On Kosmo, was finished, Sonique announced she would continue touring Europe despite the flop of the album. A teaser from some of the new material she had been working on, titled "Better Than That", 'leaked' online on 5 October 2008. Due to the positive reception of this 'leak', the track was posted available to download on various legal MP3 download sites.

She was diagnosed with breast cancer in June 2009, for which she underwent surgery at a London clinic. Following her operations, Sonique opted to receive five months of chemotherapy in an effort to prevent a recurrence. She was given the all clear in 2010 and celebrated by appearing on a cover version of the Cyndi Lauper song Girls Just Want To Have Fun, which was released to raise funds for the Cancer Research UK charity.

The single "World of Change" was released on 23 October 2009 and the official video was posted by Sonique's label on YouTube.

The year 2011 brought the release of the album Sweet Vibrations, which contains the previously released singles "Better Than That" and "World of Change".

=== 2024–present ===
In March 2024, Sonique sold out her own show at the Royal Festival Hall with special guests Baby-D and Rozalla and added a string-section and choir to her band.

On 27 June 2024, Sonique performed a DJ set on the Silver Hayes stage at the Glastonbury Festival.

In February 2025, she announced a tour to celebrate 25 years of her debut album, Hear My Cry. In September 2025, she cancelled a show at the Adrian Flux Waterfront in Norwich, which was part of her UK tour.

In November 2025, Sonique signed with Jive Global Entertainment Limited, with the label acquiring worldwide rights to her entire catalogue.

== Discography ==
=== Albums ===
List of albums, with selected chart positions and certifications
Title	Album details	Peak chart positions										Certifications
Title	Album details	UK	AUS	AUT	GER	IRE	NOR	NZ	SWE	SWI	US	Certifications
Hear My Cry	Released: 15 February 2000; Label: Serious, Universal; Format: CD, LP, cassette, digital download	6	69	9	17	45	12	20	10	2	67	BPI: Platinum; IFPI SWI: Gold
Born to Be Free	Released: 20 May 2003; Label: Serious, Universal; Format: CD, LP, cassette, digital download	142	—	—	97	—	—	—	—	—	—	
On Kosmo	Released: 13 September 2006; Label: Kosmo; Format: CD, digital download	—	—	—	—	—	—	—	—	—	—	
Sweet Vibrations	Released: 28 January 2011; Label: ZYX; Format: CD, digital download	—	—	—	—	—	—	—	—	—	—	
"—" denotes a recording that did not chart or was not released in that territory.

=== Singles ===
List of singles, with selected chart positions and certifications, showing year released and album name
Title	Year	Peak chart positions										Certifications	Album
Title	Year	UK	AUT	FRA	GER	IRE	NOR	NZ	SWE	SWI	US	Certifications	Album
"Let Me Hold You"	1985	99	—	—	—	—	—	—	—	—	—		Non-album single
"I Put a Spell on You"^{[A]}	1998	36	—	—	—	—	—	—	—	—	—		Hear My Cry
"It Feels So Good"^{[B]}	1998	24	—	—	—	—	—	—	—	—	—		Hear My Cry
"It Feels So Good" (re-release)	2000	1	2	8	2	2	1	7	3	2	8	BPI: 2× Platinum; BVMI: Gold; IFPI NOR: Platinum; IFPI SWE: Platinum; IFPI SWI: Gold; SNEP: Silver	Hear My Cry
"Sky"	2000	2	8	22	11	10	6	48	13	18	—	BPI: Silver	Hear My Cry
"I Put a Spell on You" (re-release)	2000	8	—	—	70	18	—	—	28	44	—		Hear My Cry
"Can't Make Up My Mind"	2003	17	—	—	—	—	—	—	—	—	—		Born to Be Free
"Alive"	2003	70	33	—	39	—	—	—	—	80	—		Born to Be Free
"Another World" (with Tomcraft)	2004	—	75	—	57	—	—	—	—	—	—		Sonique on Kosmo
"Why"	2005	—	—	—	90	—	—	—	—	—	—		Sonique on Kosmo
"Sleezy"	2006	—	—	—	—	—	—	—	—	—	—		Sonique on Kosmo
"Better Than That"	2009	—	—	—	—	—	—	—	—	—	—		Sweet Vibrations
"World of Change"	2009	—	—	—	—	—	—	—	—	—	—		Sweet Vibrations
"Only You" (with Paul Morrell)	2010	—	—	—	—	—	—	—	—	—	—		Non-album singles
"Don't Give a Damn"	2010	—	—	—	—	—	—	—	—	—	—		Non-album singles
"Givin' It Up" (with Christian Luke)	2010	—	—	—	—	—	—	—	—	—	—		Non-album singles
"What You're Doin'" (with Paul Morrell)	2011	—	—	—	—	—	—	—	—	—	—		Non-album singles
"Tonight"	2011	—	—	—	—	—	—	—	—	—	—		Non-album singles
"Carry On" (with Johnny Gerontakis)	2013	—	—	—	—	—	—	—	—	—	—		Non-album singles
"Don't Put Me Down"	2017	—	—	—	—	—	—	—	—	—	—		Non-album singles
"Feels So Good" (with Ramiro)	2017	—	—	—	—	—	—	—	—	—	—		Non-album singles
"Melody" (with Mauro Picotto)	2018	—	—	—	—	—	—	—	—	—	—		Non-album singles
"Shake" (featuring Power of Muzik)	2019	—	—	—	—	—	—	—	—	—	—		Non-album singles
"Keep On Lovin" (with Dario G)	2021	—	—	—	—	—	—	—	—	—	—		Non-album singles
"Only You" (with Paul Morrell)	2023	—	—	—	—	—	—	—	—	—	—		Non-album singles
"It Feels So Good" (with Matt Sassari & HUGEL)	2024	— (Note: "It Feels So Good" did not enter the UK Singles Chart, but peaked at number 29 on the UK Singles Downloads Chart.)	—	—	—	—	—	—	—	—	—		Non-album singles
"—" denotes a recording that did not chart or was not released in that territory.

=== Notes ===
- A "I Put a Spell on You" peaked at number 36 in the United Kingdom upon its original release in 1998; it was later re-released in 2001, and served as the third single from Hear My Cry in all other territories.
- B "It Feels So Good" peaked at number 24 in the United Kingdom upon its original release in 1998; it was later re-released in 2000, and served as the first single from Hear My Cry in all other territories.

== Awards and nominations ==
Year	Awards	Work	Category	Result	Ref.
2000	MOBO Awards	"It Feels So Good"	Best UK Single	Nominated	
2000	MTV Europe Music Awards	"It Feels So Good"	Best Song	Nominated	
2000	MTV Europe Music Awards	Herself	Best New Act	Nominated	
2000	MTV Europe Music Awards	Herself	Best Dance	Nominated	
2000	MTV Europe Music Awards	Herself	Best UK & Ireland Act	Nominated	
2000	NME Awards	Herself	Best Dance Act	Nominated	
2000	Smash Hits Poll Winners Party	Herself	Best Dance/Soul Act	Nominated	
2000	Smash Hits Poll Winners Party	"It Feels So Good"	Best Dance Choon	Nominated	
2000	The Record of the Year	"It Feels So Good"	Record of the Year	Nominated	
2001	BMI Pop Awards	"It Feels So Good"	Award-Winning Song	Won	
2001	Ivor Novello Awards	"It Feels So Good"	International Hit of the Year	Won	
2001	Ivor Novello Awards	"It Feels So Good"	Best Selling UK Single	Nominated	
2001	Hungarian Music Awards	Hear My Cry	Best Foreign Dance Album	Nominated	
2001	International Dance Music Awards	Herself	Best New Dance Artist Solo	Won	
2001	DanceStar Awards	Herself	DanceStar of the Year	Won	
2001	NRJ Music Awards	Herself	International Breakthrough of the Year	Nominated	
2001	Brit Awards	Herself	British Female Solo Artist	Won	
2001	Brit Awards	Herself	British Dance Act	Nominated	
2001	Brit Awards	"It Feels So Good"	British Single of the Year	Nominated	
2001	Brit Awards	"It Feels So Good"	British Video of the Year	Nominated	

== See also ==
- List of artists who reached number one on the US Dance chart
- List of number-one dance hits (United States)
