= Can't Make Up My Mind (Sonique song) =

Single by Sonique

from the album Born to Be Free
- Released: 19 May 2003 (UK)
- Recorded: 2003
- Label: Serious; Universal
- Songwriters: Graeme Louis Michael Pleeth, Sonia Marina Clarke

Sonique singles chronology
| "I Put a Spell on You" (2001) | "Can't Make Up My Mind" (2003) | "Alive" (2003) |

"Can't Make Up My Mind" is a song by DJ/singer Sonique released in May 2003. The song reached number 17 on the UK Singles Chart, spending four weeks in the top 75, while also charting on the Romanian Top 100 at 16.

== Track listing ==
1. "Can't Make Up My Mind" (Original 7 Inch Mix)
2. "Can't Make Up My Mind" (Robbie Rivera Full Vocal)
3. "Can't Make Up My Mind" (Michael Woods Remix)
4. "Can't Make Up My Mind" (Sonique Platinum Dust Mix)
5. "Can't Make Up My Mind" (Video)

== Charts ==
=== Weekly charts ===
Chart performance for "Can't Make Up My Mind"
| Chart (2003) | Peak position |
|---|---|
| Poland (Polish Airplay Chart) | 4 |
| Romania (Romanian Top 100) | 16 |
| UK Singles (OCC) | 17 |

=== Year-end charts ===
| Chart (2003) | Position |
|---|---|
| Romania (Romanian Top 100) | 89 |
