= Struggle for Pleasure =

1983 composition by Wim Mertens

"Struggle for Pleasure" is a musical piece released in 1983 by Belgian composer Wim Mertens. It is the theme music used by the Belgian phone operator Proximus. It was featured in the Peter Greenaway movie The Belly of an Architect. Energy 52's track "Café Del Mar" features a main melody based on "Struggle for Pleasure". This music was chosen for '90s television spot of Merit Cup. It was also covered by Belgian dance music group Minimalistix in 2000 and reached dance charts across Europe.
