= Hommage à Noir =

1996 film

- Directed by: Ralf Schmerberg
- Release date: 1996
- Country: Germany

Hommage à Noir ("Homage to black") is a 1996 film/visual poem set to music filmed to honor and highlight the culture of Africa. Director Ralf Schmerberg shot this film entirely in black and white, which is set to a soundtrack of African rhythms mixed with electronica.
