= Hear My Cry (album) =

Studio album by Sonique
- Released: 15 February 2000
- Recorded: September 1998 – January 2000
- Genres: Trance; electronic; house
- Length: 59:07
- Labels: Serious; Universal

Sonique chronology
Serious Sounds of Sonique – In the Mix & on the Mic (2000)	Hear My Cry (2000)	Club Mix (2001)

Hear My Cry is the debut studio album by British singer Sonique, released on 15 February 2000. It features the singles "It Feels So Good", which reached number one in the UK Singles Chart, "I Put a Spell on You" and "Sky". The album has sold over half a million copies in the UK alone. (better citation needed)

== Critical reception ==
Professional ratings
Review scores
Source	Rating
AllMusic	3/5 stars

AllMusic's Stephen Thomas Erlewine praised the album's diverse palette of dance tracks but critiqued that listeners may be disappointed that there isn't a track similar to "It Feels So Good". He concluded that "Even if there are moments that don't quite work or some forgettable songs, much of it is execeptionally produced and Sonique's singing is usually compelling."

== Track listing ==
No.	Title	Writer(s)	Length
1.	"It Feels So Good"	Sonique; Linus Burdick; Simon Belofsky; Graeme Pleeth	4:00
2.	"I Put a Spell on You"	Jay Hawkins	3:32
3.	"Are You Ready?"	Sonique; Johnny Turnbull; Fritz Catlin; Sketch Martin	4:30
4.	"Cold and Lonely"	Sonique; Belofsky; John Kettle	4:44
5.	"Drama" (featuring Calvin Richardson)	Eric Williams; Teddy Riley; Wesley Hogges; Andrea Hicks	4:41
6.	"Move Closer"	Sonique; Ric Salmon; Robin Barter	4:44
7.	"Can't Get Enough"	Sonique	4:30
8.	"Hear My Cry"	Sonique	5:18
9.	"Empty (Hideaway)"	Lukas Burton; Amanda Goseine; Kent Brainerd	3:41
10.	"Love Is on Our Side"	Marshall Jefferson; Martin Glover	3:23
11.	"Sky"	Sonique; Rick Nowels	4:26
12.	"Learn to Forget"	Graeme Dickson	3:40
13.	"It Feels So Good" (Can 7 Soulfood Club Mix)	Sonique; Burdick; Belofsky; Pleeth	7:58
14.	"Sky" (Sonique Remix)	Sonique; Nowels

Note

- Track 14 is a bonus track on some releases.

== Personnel ==
Credits adapted from the album's liner notes.

- Tony Gillis – mastering (The Hit Factory)
- Michael Halsband – photography
- Kevin Reagan – art direction, design
- Matthew Lindauer – design

== Charts ==
=== Weekly charts ===
Weekly chart performance for Hear My Cry
Chart (2000–2001)	Peak position
Australian Albums (ARIA)	69
Austrian Albums (Ö3 Austria)	9
Canada Top Albums/CDs (RPM)	25
Dutch Albums (Album Top 100)	70
Finnish Albums (Suomen virallinen lista)	11
French Albums (SNEP)	120
German Albums (Offizielle Top 100)	17
Hungarian Albums (MAHASZ)	19
Irish Albums (IRMA)	45
Italian Albums (FIMI)	30
New Zealand Albums (RMNZ)	20
Norwegian Albums (VG-lista)	12
Scottish Albums (Official Charts)	23
Swedish Albums (Sverigetopplistan)	10
Swiss Albums (Schweizer Hitparade)	11
UK Albums (Official Charts)	6
US Billboard 200	67

=== Year-end charts ===
2000 year-end chart performance for Hear My Cry
Chart (2000)	Position
Canadian Albums (Nielsen SoundScan)	159
European Albums (Music & Media)	84
German Albums (Offizielle Top 100)	88
Swiss Albums (Schweizer Hitparade)	75
UK Albums (OCC)	42

2001 year-end chart performance for Hear My Cry
Chart (2001)	Position
UK Albums (OCC)	160

== Certifications and sales ==
Certifications for Hear My Cry
Region	Certification	Certified units/sales
Spain (Promusicae)	Gold	50,000^{^}
Switzerland (IFPI Switzerland)	Gold	25,000^{^}
United Kingdom (BPI)	Platinum	300,000^{^}
Summaries
Europe (IFPI)	Platinum	1,000,000^{*}
^{*} Sales figures based on certification alone.^{^} Shipments figures based on certification alone.
