= Sven Väth =

German DJ and producer (born 1964)

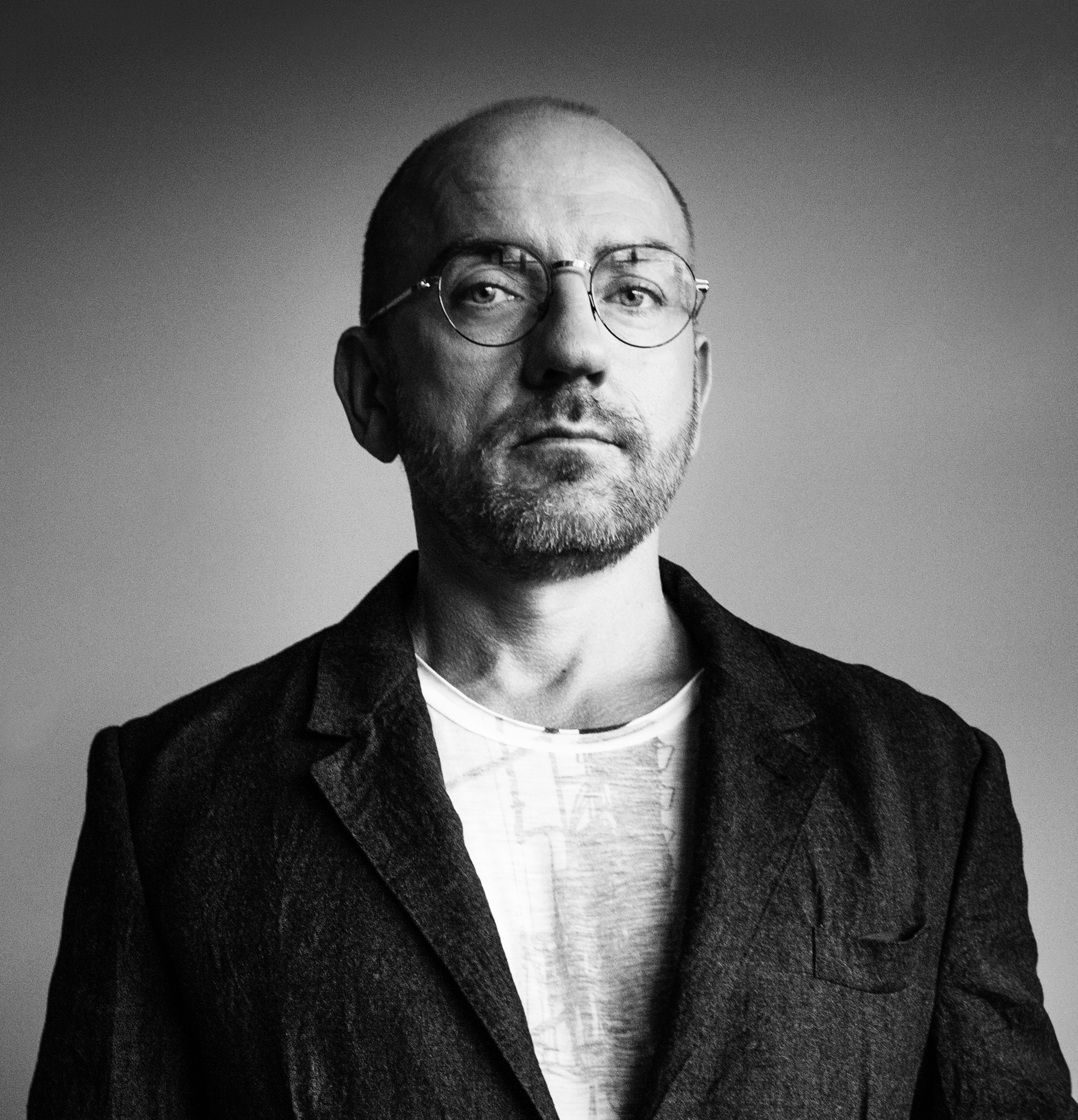
- Sven Väth in 2013

Background information
- Also known as: OFF, Astral Pilot, Barbarella, Papa Deng, Stevie fae Bäthgate
- Born: 26 October 1964 (age 62); Obertshausen, West Germany
- Genres: Techno, trance, ambient techno, new beat
- Occupations: Disc jockey, record producer
- Years active: 1982–present
- Labels: Cocoon Recordings; Warner Bros. Records (1993–1996); Virgin/EMI Records
- Website: www.cocoon.net

Sven Väth (born 26 October 1964) is a German DJ and electronic music producer. He is a three-time DJ Awards winner, with a career in electronic music spanning over 40 years. The release of the single "Electrica Salsa" with OFF in 1986 launched his career. Known as "Papa Sven" by his fans, Väth became one of Germany's pop stars in the 1990s, establishing two nightclubs in Germany and founding his own company, Cocoon, which includes a booking agency, record label, and event management branch.

Väth is recognised for his significant influence on the underground electronic music scene both in Germany and Ibiza, holding his own night at Amnesia for 18 years and hosting after-parties at creative locations across the island. A major advocate of vinyl, he performs his extensive DJ sets using only two decks and a mixer, with his longest set lasting 30 hours.

== Biography ==
Both of Sven Väth's parents were from East Germany. They escaped separately and met by chance in the West when they were very young, in a town near Frankfurt. They married and had three sons, including Sven, while his father was still a painter. Young at heart, his parents often went dancing, and his father wished to open an English pub, which they did. The pub featured a small dance floor, where Sven was introduced to a wide range of music, from rock’n’roll to disco.

In the summer of 1980, Väth visited Ibiza for the first time after hearing about it from the local scene in Frankfurt, where he was living at the time. Using his job seeker's allowance money, Väth hitchhiked from Barcelona and spent three months on the island, sleeping on beach chairs and distributing flyers for clubs to make ends meet. It was during that summer that he decided he wanted to become a DJ, enchanted by Ibiza and his time there. Upon returning to Germany, Sven's mother asked if he would DJ at his parents' pub. Sven gladly accepted. He was 17 at the time.

== Career ==
Only a year later, in 1982, Sven Väth was asked to play a residency at the club Dorian Gray in Frankfurt am Main. It was there that he met Michael Münzing and Luca Anzilotti, which led him to get into music production. In 1985, the three came together as Off (Organisation for Fun) and produced the track “Bad News”, which Sven brought with him to Ibiza and offered to Alfredo, Pippi, and Cesar – Ibiza's popular DJs at the time. The following year, in 1986, Off made waves with their new record, “Electrica Salsa” from their debut album, Organisation For Fun. The track became such a hit across Europe that Sven found himself a pop sensation, performing with stars such as Vanessa Paradis and Axel Bauer at the age of 22. It sold one million copies.

Off released a series of singles and a second album, "Ask Yourself", in 1989. Their final single, "Move Your Body," was released in 1990. Münzing and Anzilotti then moved on to their new project, Snap!.

=== Omen ===
At the age of 24, in 1988, Väth opened the dance club "Omen" in Frankfurt with Michael Münzing and Mattias Martinsohn. Previously, the venue had operated under the name "Vogue," where Väth had also been a resident for a time. The newly named club soon became one of the best in Germany, as voted by *Groove Magazine*, and is regarded as one of the birthplaces of techno in Germany. A short German film, lasting twelve minutes, documents the club's preparations for another night, including interviews with people on the dance floor sharing their thoughts on Omen. Ten years later, with a heavy heart, Sven decided to close the club in 1998. The closure was partly due to issues with landlords and city authorities. At its final party, the turnout was so large that speakers were set up outside, and people danced in the street. The police did not intervene in the party, except to block car traffic.

=== Eye Q & Harthouse Records ===
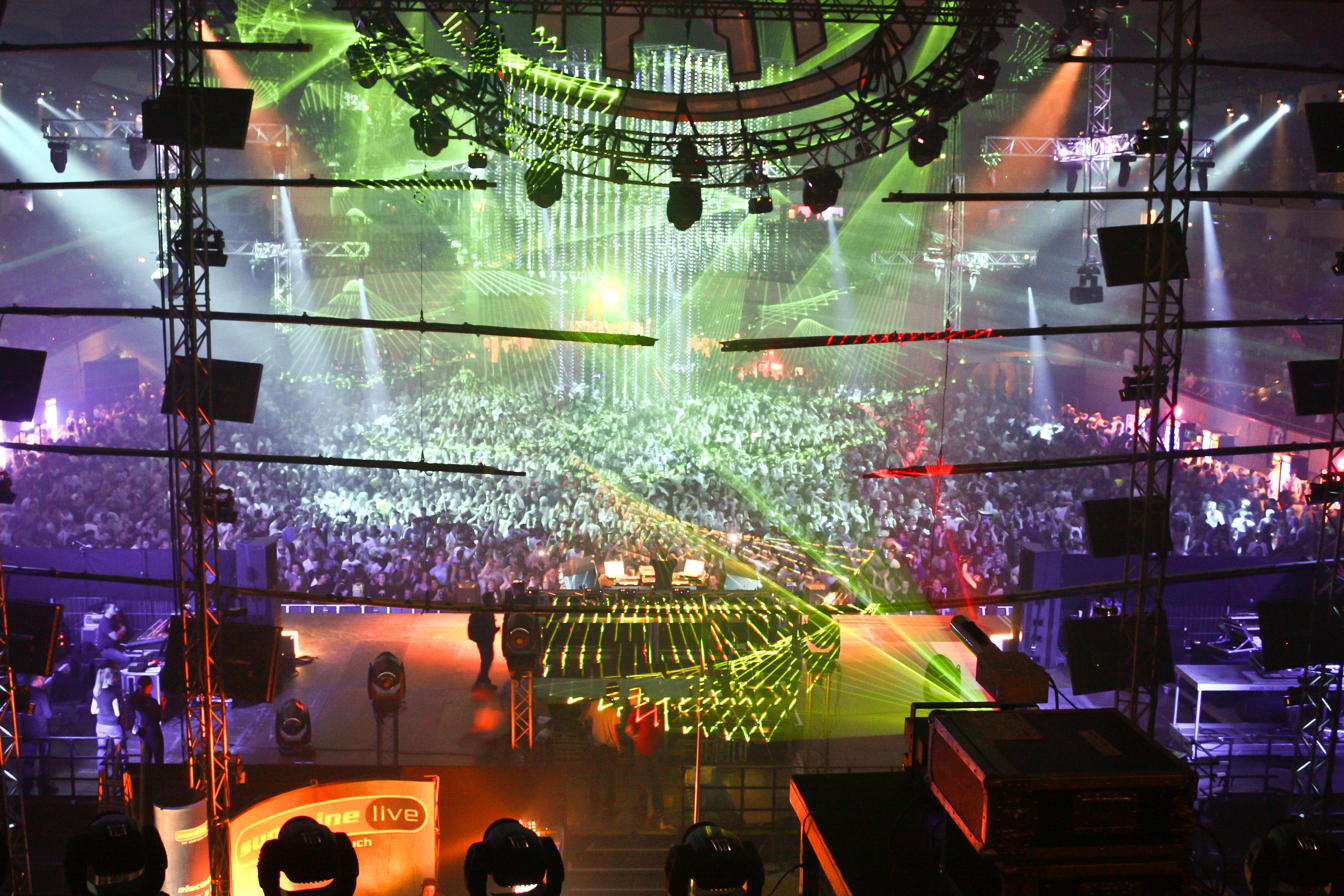
Mayday 2009, Dortmund

Eye Q was founded in 1991 by Väth, Heinz Roth, and Matthias Hoffmann, and released two of Väth's best-known albums: Accident in Paradise (1992) (which Mixmag named one of the 50 best dance albums of all time) and The Harlequin, the Robot, and the Ballet-Dancer (1994). In 1992, Sven also founded the label Harthouse Records, under which he recorded using the alias Barbarella. He parted ways with the two labels in 1997 to focus on other projects. Both labels declared bankruptcy in 1998.

=== Virgin ===
Sven Väth signed a three-album contract with major record label Virgin Records in 1998. He released Fusion (1998), Contact (2000), and Fire (2002). With the Fusion album, Väth toured worldwide, showcasing his sound of techno, electro, and trip hop. The album was also remixed by various artists and released as a special six-record vinyl edition. Virgin also released a compilation in 2000 featuring some of Väth's best work at Eye Q Records.

=== Cocoon ===
Cocoon began in 1996 as a series of parties into which Sven poured his savings. The name originated after Sven attended a performance by La Fura dels Baus in 1994 at the Tempodrom in Berlin. The show featured props of hanging cocoons filled with water, which ultimately inspired the name for his next project, symbolising metamorphosis and change. He toured with the concept across Germany and even North America. Although the parties placed a financial strain on him and were not entirely successful, Väth decided to revive the project in 1999, beginning with the establishment of a booking agency. After the agency was set up, the events and then the record label followed.

The booking agency, established with the help of Talida Wagner, has featured many famous names on its roster, such as Ricardo Villalobos, Matt John, Dubfire and Sven Väth himself. Today, it continues to provide bookings for artists such as Tobi Neumann, Onur Özer, Raresh, and many others.

Cocoon Recordings has served as the launchpad for many of today's famous DJs' careers. Artists such as Martin Buttrich, Loco Dice, Roman Flügel, and Guy Gerber have all released tracks on Cocoon. Each year, the record label releases a compilation named after a letter of the alphabet (e.g., Cocoon Compilation A) to showcase the work of signed artists. The goal of the label was to provide aspiring producers with a platform to release their music without the need for a major label. In 2013, the label celebrated its 100th release.

==== Cocoon Ibiza ====
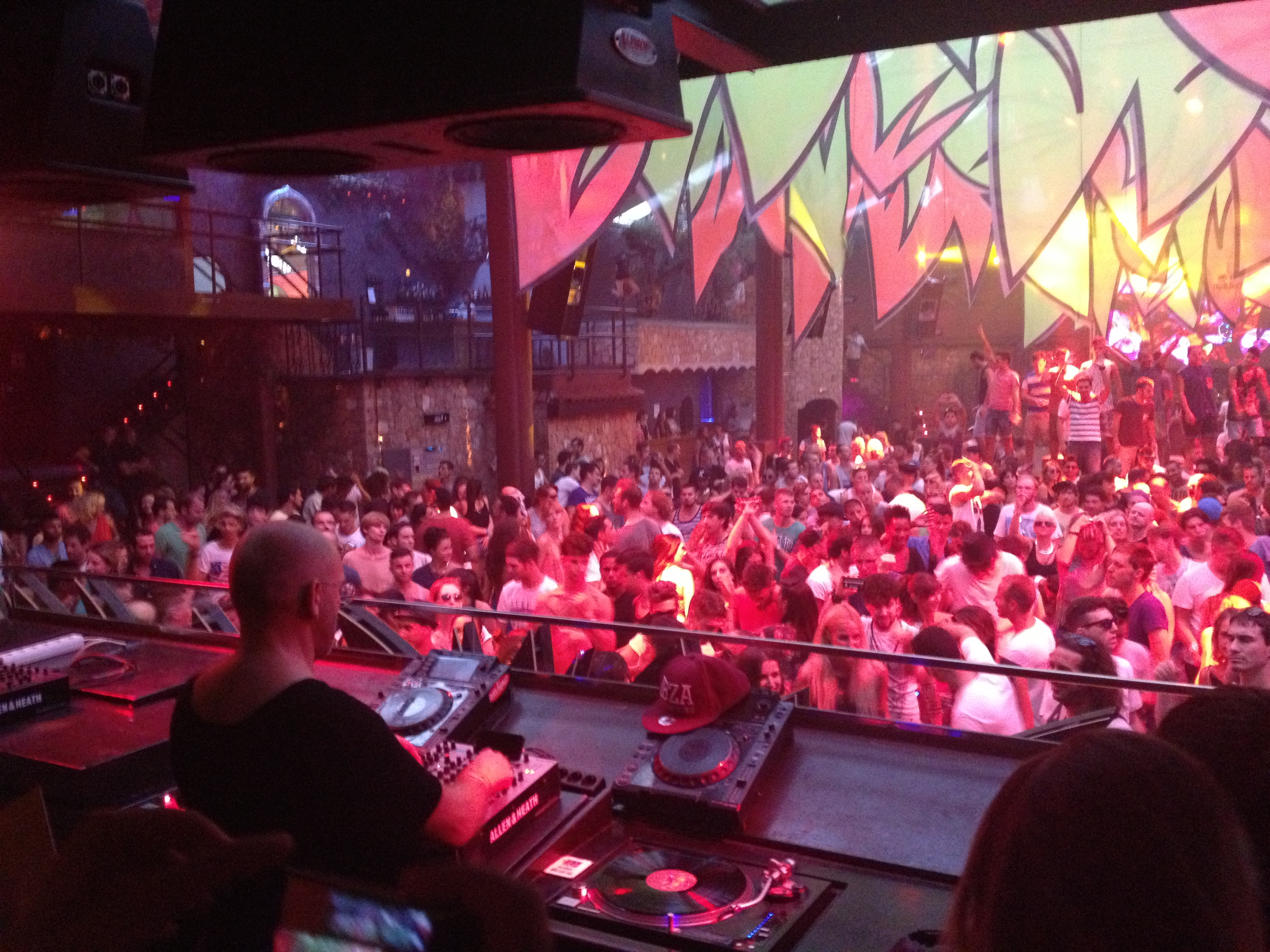
Sven Väth playing his Cocoon party in Ibiza at Amnesia club, September 2013

In the summer of 1999, Mar T of Amnesia offered Sven the opportunity to host his Cocoon parties on the one day that Amnesia was closed – Mondays. After a trial period of four parties, Cocoon parties continued for fourteen Mondays in 2000 and for the following thirteen years. The night featured a spectacular array of the world's best DJs in electronic music, with artists such as Cassy, Carl Craig, Josh Wink, Adam Beyer, and Ricardo Villalobos manning the decks. After each season, Väth releases a mix called "The Sound of the Season." Väth's Monday parties at Amnesia fostered the underground sound of Ibiza at a time when trance and commercial music were beginning to dominate the island. Each year, Cocoon's Ibiza team works on a new theme to create an exciting and distinct atmosphere for each season. Johannes Goller, a long-time friend of Sven's, has led the team since the beginning, producing each successful season. Cocoon is also known for throwing after-parties in various locations throughout Ibiza and Formentera that were often illegal, and sometimes shut down by the police. The Cocoon parties also cultivated "Cocoon Heroes" (the theme for the 12th season) such as Richie Hawtin, Loco Dice, Dubfire, and Cassy alongside Sven, all of them gathering on Mondays to play long sets in the terrace and main room of the club. Cocoon Mondays at Amnesia continued strongly until 2018. In 2018, Cocoon was moved to Pacha.

==== Cocoon Frankfurt ====
In 2004, Väth opened the club Cocoon in Frankfurt. Considered the successor to Sven's previous venture at Omen, Cocoon club also became very popular. Techno, house, and trance acts were known to perform there, with some of the better-known being Richie Hawtin, Ricardo Villalobos, Armin van Buuren, and Above & Beyond. Some of the resident DJs included Väth himself, DJ Karotte, Toni Rios, C-Rock, and Sidney Spaeth. The building contained two restaurants run by a celebrity chef, lounges, and distinctive architecture featuring "cocoon" niches where people could relax. In November 2012, Sven closed Cocoon club due to bankruptcy.

== Personal life ==
=== Family ===
Sven Väth has two children. He has a daughter, born in 1989. In 1991, he met Nina Peter, a Viennese leather fashion accessories designer, at a private party at his home in Ibiza. They married in Thailand in a Buddhist ceremony in 2008, and three years later, their son Tiga was born in Vienna on 26 July 2011. Väth is good friends with the renowned Canadian DJ/producer Tiga and named his son after him. In 2012, Väth and Peter separated. Sven has two brothers, one of whom is an art director and DJ, and the other a flower shop owner.

=== Living ===
Väth spent his childhood near Frankfurt. As he grew older, he would spend his summers in Ibiza and the rest of the year in Frankfurt, between world tours. Now, Väth has a home in Ibiza, where he spends six to eight months of the year, including the summer season for his Cocoon parties at Amnesia. In 2013, he decided to move to London to re-experience its culture, art, and parties.

After many years of DJing and partying, Väth believes in taking care of the mind and body. He learned discipline from Ayurveda, which he discovered when he lived in Goa, where he met an Ayurvedic. As the constant long nights and travelling can be quite tiring, Väth tries to live as healthfully as possible. From October to January (the off-season), he strictly follows a regimen of Ayurvedic eating with no meat, sugar, or alcohol. When his daughter was born, he ceased his use of cocaine and, a few years later, quit smoking as well.

=== Vinyl ===
A staunch supporter of vinyl, Väth will only play music that has been released on vinyl in his sets. In the IMS 2013 interview, he mentioned, “I like to go to the record store and talk to people…I’m just enjoying it so much.” He often adds that his most treasured belongings are his records. He says, "A well-manufactured record, played with a good pick-up system on a good pre-amp/mixing console, simply sounds better than any of its digital competitors. Vinyl is THE medium for everybody who sets high values on good sound." He is one of the few top 30 DJs, according to Resident Advisor, to continue using just turntables and mixers when they DJ, which he describes as his "instruments". When he heard that Technics were discontinuing the manufacture of their renowned SL-1200 turntables, he likened it to a pianist being told there would be no more grand pianos made.

== Discography ==
=== Solo albums ===
- Accident in Paradise (Eye Q, 1992) (Warner Bros. Records, 1993, U.S.)
- The Harlequin, the Robot, and the Ballet Dancer (Eye Q, 1994) (Warner Bros. Records, 1995, U.S.)
- Touch Themes of Harlequin - Robot - Ballet-Dancer (Eye Q, 1995)
- Fusion (Virgin Records, 1998)
- Six in the Mix (The Fusion Remix Collection '99) (Virgin Records, 1999)
- Contact (Ultra Records, 2000) (also released on Virgin Records)
- Fire (Virgin Records, 2002)
- Fire Works (remixes of tracks from Fire) (Virgin Records, 2003)
- Catharsis (Virgin Records, 2022)

=== Collaborations and other albums ===
- Barbarella – The Art of Dance (Eye Q, 1992; with Ralf Hildenbeutel)
- Astral Pilot – Electro Acupuncture (Eye Q, 1995; with B-Zet)
- Der Kalte Finger (Eye Q, 1996; with B-Zet), soundtrack of the film Deathline
- Retrospective 1990-1997 (single disc version) (WEA Records, 2000)
- Retrospective 1990-1997 (two disc version) (Club Culture, 2000) (also released on Warner Music in Japan)
- Allan Gauch (Virgin Records 1997–2002)

=== Mix albums ===
- DC's Hand Picked Mix Tape
- The Sound of The First Season (One Disc Version 2000)
- The Sound of The Second Season - Noche Y Dia (Two Disc Version 2001)
- The Sound of The Third Season (With Richie Hawtin) (One Disc Version 2002)
- The Sound of The Fourth Season (Two Disc Version 2003)
- The Sound of The Fifth Season (One Disc Version 2004)
- The Sound of The Sixth Season (Two Disc Version 2005)
- The Sound of The Seventh Season (Two Disc Version 2006)
- The Sound of The Eighth Season (Two Disc Version 2007)
- The Sound of The Ninth Season (Two Disc Version 2008)
- The Sound of The Tenth Season (Two Disc Version 2009)
- The Sound of The Eleventh Season (Two Disc Version 2010)
- The Sound of The Twelfth Season (Two Disc Version 2011)
- The Sound of The Thirteenth Season (Two Disc Version 2012)
- The Sound of The Fourteenth Season (Two Disc Version 2013)
- The Sound of The Fifteenth Season (Two Disc Version 2014)
- The Sound of The Sixteenth Season (Two Disc Version 2015)
- The Sound of The Seventeenth Season (2016)
- The Sound of The 18th Season (2017)
- The Sound of The 19th Season (2018)
- The Sound of The 20th Season (2019)

=== Singles ===
- "L'Esperanza" No. 5 Hot Dance Club Play; No. 63 UK (1993)
- "Ritual of Life" (Eye Q, 1993)
- "Ballet-Fusion" (Eye Q, 1994)
- "Fusion - Scorpio's Movement" (Virgin Records, 1997)
- "Breakthrough" (Virgin Records, 1998)
- "Face It" (Virgin Records, 1998)
- "Omen A.M." (Virgin Records, 1998)
- "Schubdüse" (Virgin Records, 1998)
- "Sounds Control Your Mind" (Virgin Records, 1998)
- "Augenblick" (Virgin Records, 1999)
- "Dein Schweiß" (Virgin Records, 1999)
- "Discophon" (Virgin Records, 1999)
- "Barbarella" (remix) (Club Culture, 2000)
- "L'Esperanza" (remix) (Club Culture, 2000)
- "My Name Is Barbarella" (Code Blue, 2000)
- "Je t'aime... moi non plus" (featuring Miss Kittin) / Design Music (Virgin Records, 2001)
- "Strahlemann und Söhne" (remix) (Virgin Records, 2001)
- "Mind Games" (Virgin Records, 2002)
- "Set My Heart on Fire" (Virgin Records, 2002)
- "Komm" (Cocoon Recordings, 2005)
- "Spring Love" (Datapunk, 2006)
- "The Beauty and the Beast" (Cocoon Records, 2008)
- Mystic Voices (2022)
