= It Feels So Good =

1998 single by Sonique

- Artwork for the 2000 UK/European release

Single by Sonique

from the album Hear My Cry
- B-side: "I Put a Spell on You" (remastered 12-inch mix)
- Released: 9 November 1998
- Length: 4:00 (album version); 3:49 (radio edit)
- Label: Serious; Universal; Republic
- Songwriters: Sonia Clarke; Linus Burdick; Simon Belofsky; Graeme Pleeth
- Producers: Graeme Pleeth; Chris Allen; Simon Belofsky; Sonia Clarke

Sonique singles chronology
| "Let Me Hold You" (1985) | "It Feels So Good" (1998) | "Sky" (2000) |

Music video
- "It Feels So Good" (2000 video) on YouTube

It Feels So Good is a song by British singer Sonique from her album Hear My Cry. It was originally released on 9 November 1998 and peaked at number 24 on the UK Singles Chart. In May 2000, following the song's success in the United States, the single was re-released and spent three weeks at number one on the same chart. The song remained in the top 40 for 14 weeks and became the third-biggest-selling single of 2000 in Britain. It has sold over 800,000 copies in the UK as of May 2020.

The song also achieved success in many other countries, including the United States, where repeated radio airplay in Florida helped it reach number eight on the Billboard Hot 100 and led Sonique to sign with Republic Records. In 2017, BuzzFeed listed the song at number 33 on its list of "The 101 Greatest Dance Songs of the '90s".

In 2024, the song was revived in a remix by Matt Sassari and Hugel; the single peaked at number 29 on the UK Singles Downloads Chart.

== Background and content ==
Sonique said of the song, "It's about this guy whom I really liked years ago, but who didn't return my feelings. He was very successful, and I wasn't—at that time. He thought that I was in love with his success. This song is just a way of declaring that it was him I liked." The song received widespread acclaim after it was played by a Tampa, Florida deejay in February 2000. Due to its popularity, Sonique was approached by Universal Music executives Doug Morris and Jimmy Iovine. She was eventually signed to Universal, and her album Hear My Cry became the first to be released on Universal's new internet-based record label, Republic Records.

== Critical reception ==
Stephen Thomas Erlewine of AllMusic praised the song, stating that "The hit single 'It Feels So Good' is a dynamite dance-club item, blending straight-ahead dance with flourishes of techno and a sweet, catchy melody. It is a bright, fresh single that sets the stage for an album's worth of similar material, not just because it was the first hit, but because it kicks off the record."

== Commercial performance ==
Previously released in 1998, the song made a brief chart appearance on the UK Singles Chart, debuting at number 24 on the chart dated 5 December 1998. It remained on the chart for two additional weeks before leaving it. It later reappeared at number 91 on the chart dated 27 November 1999. In early 2000, the song was re-released, re-entering straight at number one and becoming Sonique's first song to top the charts in the United Kingdom. It remained at the top position for a total of three weeks. It also ended the year ranked third in the 2000 year-end chart. As of May 2020, the song has sold 829,000 chart sales in the UK. The song was a major hit across Europe, reaching number one in Hungary, Norway, Portugal and Romania, and entering the top 10 in over 16 countries.

In the United States, the song also achieved commercial success, becoming a multi-format hit. It charted simultaneously on the Billboard Hot 100, Dance Club Play, Mainstream Top 40, Maxi-Singles Sales and Rhythmic Top 40 charts. While topping the Dance Club Play chart and reaching the top five on the Mainstream Top 40, it peaked at number eight on the Hot 100 and spent six months on the chart.

== Track listings ==
=== Original release ===
UK CD1 (1998)

1. "It Feels So Good" (original 7-inch mix)
2. "It Feels So Good" (12-inch breakbeat edit)
3. "It Feels So Good" (Serious remix)

UK CD2 (1998)

1. "It Feels So Good" (7-inch breakbeat edit)
2. "It Feels So Good" (original 12-inch mix)
3. "I Put a Spell on You" (remastered 12-inch mix)

UK 12-inch single (1998)

A1. "It Feels So Good" (12-inch breakbeat edit)
B1. "It Feels So Good" (original 12-inch mix)
B2. "It Feels So Good" (Serious remix)

US CD single (1999)

1. "It Feels So Good" (7-inch breakbeat) – 3:49
2. "It Feels So Good" (12-inch breakbeat) – 6:02

Australian CD single (1999)

1. "It Feels So Good" (original 7-inch mix)
2. "It Feels So Good" (breakbeat 7-inch)
3. "It Feels So Good" (Serious remix)
4. "It Feels So Good" (original 12-inch mix)
5. "It Feels So Good" (video)

Japanese CD single (2000)

1. "It Feels So Good" (radio edit)
2. "It Feels So Good" (original 12-inch mix)

=== Re-release (2000) ===
UK CD single

1. "It Feels So Good" (radio edit) – 3:49
2. "It Feels So Good" (Can 7 Soulfood club mix) – 7:57
3. "It Feels So Good" (The Conductor & The Cowboy's Amnesia Mix) – 8:11

UK 12-inch single

A1. "It Feels So Good" (Can 7 Soulfood club mix) – 7:57
AA1. "It Feels So Good" (original breakbeat mix) – 6:02
AA2. "It Feels So Good" (En-Motion Remix) – 5:52

UK cassette single

1. "It Feels So Good" (radio edit) – 3:49
2. "It Feels So Good" (Can 7 Soulfood club mix) – 7:57
3. "It Feels So Good" (Serious remix) – 7:50

European CD single

1. "It Feels So Good" (radio edit) – 3:49
2. "It Feels So Good" (Serious remix) – 7:50

== Charts ==
=== Weekly charts ===
==== Original version ====
| Chart (2000) | Peak position |
|---|---|
| Australia (ARIA) | 21 |
| Austria (Ö3 Austria Top 40) | 2 |
| Belgium (Ultratop 50 Flanders) | 15 |
| Belgium (Ultratop 50 Wallonia) | 9 |
| Canada Top Singles (RPM) | 1 |
| Canada Adult Contemporary (RPM) | 47 |
| Canada Dance/Urban (RPM) | 2 |
| Czech Republic (IFPI) | 9 |
| Denmark (IFPI) | 3 |
| Europe (Eurochart Hot 100) | 4 |
| Finland (Suomen virallinen lista) | 7 |
| France (SNEP) | 8 |
| Germany (GfK) | 2 |
| Greece (IFPI) | 3 |
| Hungary (Mahasz) | 1 |
| Iceland (Íslenski Listinn Topp 40) | 22 |
| Ireland (IRMA) | 2 |
| Italy (FIMI) | 6 |
| Netherlands (Dutch Top 40) | 5 |
| Netherlands (Single Top 100) | 9 |
| New Zealand (Recorded Music NZ) | 7 |
| Norway (VG-lista) | 1 |
| Poland Airplay (Music & Media) | 6 |
| Portugal (AFP) | 1 |
| Quebec (ADISQ) | 11 |
| Romania (Romanian Top 100) | 1 |
| Scottish Singles Sales (Official Charts) | 1 |
| Spain (Promusicae) | 2 |
| Sweden (Sverigetopplistan) | 3 |
| Switzerland (Schweizer Hitparade) | 2 |
| UK Singles (Official Charts) | 1 |
| US Billboard Hot 100 | 8 |
| US Dance Club Play (Billboard) | 1 |
| US Mainstream Top 40 (Billboard) | 5 |
| US Maxi-Singles Sales (Billboard) | 25 |
| US Rhythmic Top 40 (Billboard) | 9 |

==== Matt Sassari and Hugel version ====
| Chart (2025) | Peak position |
|---|---|
| Hungary (Dance Top 40) | 10 |
| Hungary (Rádiós Top 40) | 1 |
| Poland (Polish Airplay Top 100) | 97 |
| UK Singles Downloads (Official Charts) | 29 |

=== Year-end charts ===
==== Original version ====
| Chart (2000) | Position |
|---|---|
| Australia (ARIA) | 84 |
| Austria (Ö3 Austria Top 40) | 25 |
| Belgium (Ultratop 50 Flanders) | 74 |
| Belgium (Ultratop 50 Wallonia) | 25 |
| Denmark (IFPI) | 22 |
| Europe (Eurochart Hot 100) | 12 |
| France (SNEP) | 33 |
| Germany (Media Control) | 22 |
| Ireland (IRMA) | 11 |
| Netherlands (Dutch Top 40) | 7 |
| Netherlands (Single Top 100) | 44 |
| New Zealand (RIANZ) | 27 |
| Romania (Romanian Top 100) | 5 |
| Spain (AFYVE) | 7 |
| Sweden (Hitlistan) | 34 |
| Switzerland (Schweizer Hitparade) | 12 |
| UK Singles (OCC) | 3 |
| US Billboard Hot 100 | 34 |
| US Dance Club Play (Billboard) | 41 |
| US Mainstream Top 40 (Billboard) | 17 |
| US Rhythmic Top 40 (Billboard) | 26 |

==== Matt Sassari and Hugel version ====
| Chart (2025) | Position |
|---|---|
| Hungary (Dance Top 40) | 41 |
| Hungary (Rádiós Top 40) | 4 |

=== Decade-end charts ===
| Chart (2000–2009) | Position |
|---|---|
| UK Top 100 Songs of the Decade | 34 |

== Certifications ==
| Region | Certification | Certified units/sales |
|---|---|---|
| Australia (ARIA) | Gold | 35,000^{^} |
| Belgium (BRMA) | Gold | 25,000^{*} |
| Denmark | — | 6,654 |
| France (SNEP) | Silver | 125,000^{*} |
| Germany (BVMI) | Gold | 250,000^{^} |
| New Zealand (RMNZ) | Gold | 15,000^{‡} |
| Norway (IFPI Norway) | Platinum | |
| Sweden (GLF) | Platinum | 30,000^{^} |
| Switzerland (IFPI Switzerland) | Gold | 25,000^{^} |
| United Kingdom (BPI) | 2× Platinum | 1,200,000^{‡} |
^{*} Sales figures based on certification alone.^{^} Shipments figures based on certification alone.^{‡} Sales+streaming figures based on certification alone.

== Release history ==
| Region | Date | Format(s) | Label(s) | Ref. |
|---|---|---|---|---|
| United Kingdom | 9 November 1998 | 12-inch vinyl; CD | Serious | |
| United States | 11 January 2000 | Rhythmic contemporary; contemporary hit radio | Republic; Universal | |
| Japan | 19 April 2000 | CD | Universal Music Japan | |
| United Kingdom (re-release) | 22 May 2000 | 12-inch vinyl; CD; cassette | Serious; Universal | |
| New Zealand | 12 June 2000 | CD | Universal | |

== See also ==
- List of Romanian Top 100 number ones of the 2000s
