= Minimalistix =

Belgian musical group

Minimalistix was a progressive trance music project from Belgium, consisting of members Dave Lambrechts, Janus De Decker, Johan Casters, Peter Bellaert and Steve Sidewinder (Andy Vandierendonck) Poison Ivy (Els Mortelmans) voice and performance on stage and existing from 2000 to 2010.

The group was started by Bellaert (alias Brian Koner) who purchased his first synthesizer at the age of eighteen, and gained his first recording contract in 1991, when he signed to Snowball Records. The group first gained mainstream recognition with the white label single, "Struggle for Pleasure" (a remix of the 1983 Wim Mertens track) in Belgium dance clubs. In 2000 the track reached the Top 10 of European radio dance tracks. Two of the group's singles reached the Top 40 in the UK Singles Chart: "Close Cover" (another Wim Mertens composition) peaking at #12, and "Magic Fly" (remix of Space's 1977 hit) at #36. Meanwhile "Struggle For Pleasure" reached #38 in the Dutch chart, and "Close Cover" made #34.

Minimalistix's first album, Elements, was released in 2002.

== Discography ==
=== Singles ===
Title	Year	Peak chart positions					
Title	Year	BEL (Vl.)	BEL (Wa.) Tip	DEN	NLD	UK	UK Dance
"Struggle for Pleasure"	2000	6	15	20	34	80	37
"Voices for Jana"	2000	–	–	–	–	–	–
"A Forest"	2001	–	–	–	–	–	–
"Close Cover"	2001	29	–	–	38	12	4
"Twin Peaks Theme"	2001	37	–	–	–	–	–
"Magic Fly"	2002	47	–	–	–	36	6
"Whistling Drive" (aka Young Folks)	2007	–	–	–	–	–	–
"Code to Blue"	2008	–	–	–	–	–	–
"Ashk"	2009	–	–	–	–	–	–

=== Albums ===
- 2002 Elements [Moskito]
- 2002 Tranthem - Mixed By Minimalistix [Superb Trax]

=== Remixes ===
- 2000 The Traveler & In Motion "Believe" [Five AM]
- 2000 Trancid "I Would Stay" [Sphear]
- 2001 Lost Witness "Did I Dream" (Song to the Siren)" [Data]
- 2001 Montini "The Sound of Innocence Goes On" [Sphear]
- 2002 Tillmann Uhrmacher "On the Run" [Telstar TV]
- 2002 Flesh & Bones "My Time Has Come" [Mostiko]
- 2002 Poison I.V. "Adagio for Strings" [Sony Music Entertainment]
- 2002 CREA & D.A.I. "Free And Easy" [Avex Trax]
- 2002 DJ Sammy "Sunlight" [Polystar]
- 2002 4 Strings "Diving" [Poylstar]
- 2002 Sushi "The Earthshaker" [Bang On!]
- 2002 Flesh & Bones "I Love You" [Telstar TV]
- 2002 DJ Gert "Give Me Some More" [Y2K]
- 2002 Kira "I'll Be Your Angel" [Multiply]
- 2002 Redd Square ft. Tiff Lacey "In Your Hands" [Inferno]
- 2003 Kira "2 Hearts" [Mostiko]
- 2003 Junkie XL ft. Solomon Burke "Catch Up To My Step" [Roadrunner]
- 2003 Decoy & Roy "Inner Life" [Decadance Recordings]
- 2005 White Widow "I Am Leaving You" [Mostiko]
- 2006 Knarf FC "Fortune" [Mostiko]
- 2007 Regi ft. Scala "I Fail" [Mostiko]
