= Energy 52 =

German trance music project

- Origin: Berlin, Germany
- Genre: Trance
- Years active: 1991–1993
- Label: Eye Q Records
- Past members: Paul Schmitz-Moormann; Harald Blüchel

"Café del Mar (Three 'n' One Mix)" (1997)
"Café del Mar (Three 'n' One Mix)" was one of the most popular of the Café del Mar remixes.

Energy 52 was a trance project of German DJ Paul Schmitz-Moormann (DJ Kid Paul). The project was supported by Cosmic Baby (Harald Blüchel), who produced, co-composed and remixed tracks.

The project is best known for the 1993 track "Café del Mar" which became one of the most popular trance songs of its time, being remixed a significant number of times and featuring on hundreds of compilation albums. In April 2011, the song was voted number one by BBC Radio 1 listeners in Pete Tong's Top 20 Dance Tracks of the last 20 years.
