= Eye Q (record label) =

German record label

Eye Q was a record label founded in 1990 by Sven Väth and Heinz Roth. It was based in Offenbach, Germany, specialized in trance music and greatly influenced the Sound of Frankfurt. Eye Q ceased operations in 1997 due to financial problems.

Harthouse and Recycle or Die were sublabels founded in 1992.

== See also ==
- List of record labels
