= Pascal & Pearce discography =

- Studio albums: 3
- Compilation albums: 3
- Singles: 16
- Remixes: 32

The discography of South African DJ duo Pascal & Pearce includes three studio albums, three compilation albums, and eight charting singles. It also features numerous other remixes, releases and compilation features.

== Albums ==
=== Studio albums ===
List of studio albums
Title	Album details
Passport	Released: September 5, 2011; Label: Just Music; Formats: Digital download, CD
Passport 2.0	Released: November 26, 2012; Label: Just Music; Formats: Digital download, CD
One Night Only	Released: September 30, 2013; Label: Just Music; Formats: Digital download, CD

=== Compilation albums ===
List of compilation albums
Title	Album details
**Passport to Ibiza**	Released: October 1, 2012; Label: Just Music; Formats: CD, digital download
**Ministry of Sound Presents Headliners: Pascal & Pearce**	Released: March 18, 2013; Label: Just Music; Formats: CD, digital download
**Toolroom Knights (South Africa) - Pascal & Pearce**	Released: July 7, 2014; Label: Just Music; Formats: Digital download

== Singles ==
=== Charted singles ===
List of singles as lead artist, with selected chart positions, showing year released
Title	Year	Peak chart positions			Label
Title	Year	SA iTunes Dance	5FM Top 40	MTV SA Dance	Label
**"Paper Skies"** (with Michelle Breeze)	2011		9		Just Music
**"Days Go By"** (with Louise Carver)	2012		5		Just Music
**"Beautiful Lie"** (with Yoav)	2012		5		Just Music
**"Disco Sun"** (with GoodLuck)	2012		1		Just Music
**"Desperado"** (with LCNVL)	2013	1	1	1	Just Music
**"Jericho"** (with Jimmy Nevis)	2014		2		Just Music
**"Poppin"** (with Da L.E.S)	2014		2		Just Music
**"Running Wild"** (with Jethro Tait)	2017	1	9		Universal Music Group South Africa

=== Other singles ===
List of non-charting singles as lead artist showing year released
Title	Year	Label
**"Esta Sucio"**	2008	Grooved Music
**"Disko Biskit"**	2009	Electric Sushi
**"Mooiness"**	2009	Flexual Records
**"The Irie Bounce"**	2009	Electric Sushi
**"Banduru"**	2014	Just Music
**"Mechico"**	2014	Vacation Records
**"Murder On The Dancefloor"** (with LCNVL)	2014	Just Music
**"Rain"** (with Mark Stent & Astryd Brown)	2016	Sony Music Entertainment Africa
**"Lose Control"** (with Johnny Apple)	2018	Universal Music Group South Africa
**"I Got Ya Babe"** (with LCNVL)	2019	Universal Music Group South Africa
**"Rain 2020"** (with Mark Stent & Astryd Brown)	2020	3 Girls Music
**"The Clubhouse"**	2021	UFO Recordz
**"Like A Freak"**	2021	UFO Recordz
**"Sky Walker"**	2021	UFO Recordz

== Remixes ==
List of remixes showing year released
Artist	Track title	Year	Label
The Squatters	"Bring Back The Duck"	2008	Grooved Music
Emanuel Kosh	"Make My Music"	2010	Electric Sushi
Lady Leah, GB Collective & Catsax	"Catch Me If You Can"	2010	Beat Boutique SA
Locnville	"Sun In My Pocket"	2010	Just Music
Flash Republic	"Lonely"	2011	Just Music
GoodLuck	"Hop On Hop Off"	2011	Just Music
Locnville	"Staring At The World Outside"	2011	Just Music
Locnville	"Stars Above You"	2011	Just Music
TV Rock, Hook N Sling & Rudy	"Diamonds In The Sky"	2011	Neon Records
Zebra & Giraffe	"Terrified"	2011	Just Music
Deep Filth	"My City By Night"	2012	NOIZE
Robyn Banks ft. Bekuh Boom	"You Can Find Me (Lost On The Dancefloor"	2012	Just Music
Tailor	"Wolf"	2012	Just Music
Toya Delazy	"Heart"	2012	Sony Music Entertainment Africa
Arno Carstens	"2 Dogs"	2013	Just Music
Duck Sauce	"It's You"	2013	3 Beat Records
LCNVL	"Closer"	2013	Just Music
Louise Carver	"How You Gonna Do It"	2013	Evergreen Music
Mphoza	"Moove"	2013	Soul Candi Records
Royal K ft. Alka	"Stars"	2013	F! Records
Yoav	"Blink"	2013	Just Music
Zebra & Giraffe	"My Best"	2013	Just Music
Blitzkrieg	"Gemini"	2014	Nexus Media
ClassyMenace ft. SteKobe	"U & Me"	2014	Sony Music Entertainment Africa
Matthew Mole	"Autumn"	2014	Just Music
Zebra & Giraffe	"Dancing"	2014	Just Music
Chambers	"Heaven's Got No Place"	2015	Sony Music Entertainment Africa
Phunk Investigation ft. Emory Toler	"Good Times"	2015	Miniatures Recordings
Toya Delazy ft. Cassper Nyovest	"Luv My City"	2015	Sony Music Entertainment Africa
Johnny Clegg & Savuka	"Great Heart"	2016	Rhythm Safari
Shortstraw	"House"	2016	Boosh Music
Vassy & Playmen	"I Should Have Said"	2016	Minos - EMI SA
Break DLaw & The Glitchfox	"Lonely"	2020	UFO Recordz

== Compilation features ==
List of compilation albums features showing year released
Album title	Track title	Year	Label
**Big Floor Destroyers Vol. 1**	"Disko Biskit"	2010	Straight Up!
**King & Queen of Clubs** (Mixed by Lady Lea & DJ Morgan)	"Catch Me If You Can" (Pascal & Pearce Remix)	2011	Beat Boutique SA
**Addicted to Bass** (Ministry of Sound)	"Paper Skies vs. Passport" (ESC Remix)	2012	Just Music
**Addicted to Bass** (Ministry of Sound)	"Heartbeat" (Pascal & Pearce Remix)	2012	Just Music
**Azuli Ibiza '12** (Mixed by Starkillers)	"Disco Sun" (Starkillers Remix)	2012	Azuli Records
**Cape Town Sessions** (Ministry of Sound)	"Disco Sun" (Treasurefingers Remix)	2012	Just Music
**Clubbers Guide 2012** (Ministry of Sound)	"Disco Sun" (Treasurefingers Remix)	2012	Just Music
**DJ's Only 2012** (Ministry of Sound)	"Beautiful Lie" (with Yoav)	2012	Just Music
**DJ's Only 2012** (Ministry of Sound)	"Days Go By 2012" (with Louise Carver)	2012	Just Music
**Hed Kandi: World Series USA**	"Disco Sun" (Treasurefingers Remix)	2012	Hed Kandi
**Pop Up! #1** (Perez Hilton)	"Disco Sun" (with GoodLuck)	2012	Opus Records
**The Sound Of Dubstep** (Ministry of Sound)	"Levels" (Pascal & Pearce Remix)	2012	Just Music
**This Is EDM**	"Disco Sun" (with GoodLuck) Just Music	2012	
**Ibiza Annual 2013** (Ministry of Sound)	"Disco Sun" (with GoodLuck)	2012	Just Music
**10** (Homegrown Edition)	"Paper Skies" (with Michelle Breeze)	2013	Just Music
**Now Dance 3**	"Desperado" (with LCNVL)	2013	Sony Music Entertainment Africa
**Oppikoppi** (Bewilderbeast 2013)	"Viva Party" (with Toya Delazy	2013	Just Music
**Running Trax 2014** (Ministry of Sound)	"Desperado" (Blasterjaxx Remix)	2013	Just Music
**The Annual 2014** (Ministry of Sound)	"Fire Within" (with Ard Matthews)	2013	Just Music
**The Mix** (Ministry of Sound)	"Viva Party" (with Toya Delazy	2013	Just Music
**10** (Dance Edition)	"Disco Sun" (with GoodLuck)	2014	Just Music
**Bump 34**	"Jericho" (Pascal & Pearce 2014 Remix)	2014	F! Records
**Crank It Up Vol. 8**	"Mechico"	2014	Straight Up!
**Dance Anthems 2014 Vol. 2**	"Jericho" (Pascal & Pearce 2014 Remix)	2014	Just Music
**Dance Hits 2014**	"Jericho" (with Jimmy Nevis)	2014	Sony Music Entertainment Africa
**Oppikoppi Odyssey** (20 Years)	"Desperado" (with LCNVL)	2014	Just Music
The PrankSta Presents: (#PowerEDM)	"Jericho" (with Jimmy Nevis)	2014	Just Music
The PrankSta Presents: (#PowerEDM)	"Smile" (with Polina Griffith)	2014	Just Music
**Ultra South Africa 2014**	"Smile" (with Polina Griffith)	2014	Sony Music Entertainment Africa
**Vin Mix 2014**	"Desperado" (Blasterjaxx Remix)	2014	Just Music
**Vin Mix 2014**	"Fire Within" (with Ard Matthews)	2014	Just Music
**Vin Mix 2014**	"Jericho" (with Jimmy Nevis)	2014	Just Music
**Vin Mix 2014**	"Murder On The Dancefloor" (with LCNVL)	2014	Just Music
**Mark Stent Presents: Africa Weapons**	"Rain" (with Mark Stent & Astryd Brown)	2015	Universal Music Group South Africa
**Clubland 2016 Vol. 2**	"Great Heart" (Pascal & Pearce Remix)	2016	Universal Music Group South Africa
**Now Dance 9**	"Rain" (with Mark Stent & Astryd Brown)	2016	Universal Music Group South Africa
**The Annual 2017** (Ministry of Sound)	"Rain" (So Schway Remix)	2016	Sony Music Special Projects
**The Roger Goode Show Presents** (The Happy Hour)	"Rain" (with Mark Stent & Astryd Brown)	2016	Sony Music Entertainment Africa
**The Roger Goode Show Presents** (The Happy Hour)	"Luv My City" (Pascal & Pearce Remix)	2016	Sony Music Entertainment Africa
**Ultra South Africa 2016**	"Rain" (Drumhide Remix)	2016	Sony Music Entertainment Africa
**Now That's What I Call Music Vol. 77**	"Running Wild" (with Jethro Tait)	2017	Universal Music Group South Africa
**Ultra South Africa 2018**	"Running Wild" (with Jethro Tait)	2018	Sony Music Entertainment Africa

== Album features ==
List of studio album features
Track title	Album title	Release details
**"Disco Sun"** (DubVision Remix)	GoodLuck (The Lucky Packet Mixtape)	Released: December 3, 2012; Label: Just Music; Formats: CD, digital download
**"When The Sun Goes Down"** (with Locnville)	Locnville (Running To Midnight)	Released: December 3, 2012; Label: Just Music; Formats: CD, digital download
**"Viva Party"** (with Toya Delazy)	Toya Delazy (Due Drop)	Released: February 22, 2013; Label: Sony Music Entertainment Africa; Formats: CD, digital download
**"Heart"** (Pascal & Pearce Remix)	Toya Delazy (Due Drop)	Released: February 22, 2013; Label: Sony Music Entertainment Africa; Formats: CD, digital download
**"Desperado"** (ESCape Remix)	ESCape (The Reality)	Released: November 20, 2013; Label: Just Music; Formats: Digital download
**"Desperado"** (Blasterjaxx Remix)	LCNVL (The Odyssey)	Released: December 24, 2013; Label: Just Music; Formats: CD, digital download
**"Murder On The Dancefloor"** (with LCNVL)	LCNVL (The Odyssey)	Released: December 24, 2013; Label: Just Music; Formats: CD, digital download
**"Desperado"** (with LCNVL)	Locnville vs. LCNVL (The Hits)	Released: December 4, 2015; Label: Just Music; Formats: CD, digital download
**"Murder On The Dancefloor"** (with LCNVL)	Locnville vs. LCNVL (The Hits)	Released: December 4, 2015; Label: Just Music; Formats: CD, digital download
**"When The Sun Goes Down"** (with Locnville)	Locnville vs. LCNVL (The Hits)	Released: December 4, 2015; Label: Just Music; Formats: CD, digital download
