= Passport (Pascal & Pearce album) =

Studio album by Pascal & Pearce
- Released: 5 September 2011
- Genre: Electro house, progressive house, funky house, dubstep
- Length: 64:35
- Label: Just Music
- Producer: Pascal & Pearce

Pascal & Pearce chronology
Passport (2011)	One Night Only (2013)

Passport is the debut studio album from South African DJ duo Pascal & Pearce. It was released on the 5th of September 2011, by South African independent record label Just Music. In South Africa, it was released as a limited edition physical double disc CD, disc 2 being a collection of remixes done by the duo. It was nominated in the Best Dance Album category in the 2012 South African Music Awards.

== Track listing ==
No.	Title	Writer(s)	Length
1.	"Paper Skies" (featuring Michelle Breeze)	D. Pearce, P. Ellinas, M. Breeze	6:01
2.	"A Way Through" (featuring Greg Carlin)	D. Pearce, P. Ellinas, G. Carlin	5:55
3.	"Diski La Dutch" (featuring Lazee)	D. Pearce, P. Ellinas, M. Kulego	5:30
4.	"In This House"	D D. Pearce, P. Ellinas	5:31
5.	"Disco Sun" (featuring Juliet Harding from GoodLuck)	D. Pearce, P. Ellinas, J. Harding	7:02
6.	"Wild Eyes" (featuring The Swedish Baker)	D. Pearce, P. Ellinas, R. Botha	5:21
7.	"When The Sun Goes Down" (featuring Locnville)	D. Pearce, P. Ellinas, A. Chaplin, B. Chaplin	4:47
8.	"New Dert"	D. Pearce, P. Ellinas	7:16
9.	"So High" (featuring Tamara Dey)	D. Pearce, P. Ellinas, T. Dey	6:24
10.	"Passport" (featuring Yoav)	D. Pearce, P. Ellinas, Y. Sadan	6:01
11.	"Days Go By" (featuring Louise Carver)	D. Pearce, P. Ellinas, L. Carver	4:47

== Awards and nominations ==
Award	Nominated work	Category	Result
18th South African Music Awards 2012	Pascal & Pearce for Passport	Best Dance Album	Nominated

== Personnel ==
- Pascal & Pearce – primary artist
- Pascal Ellinas – producer, engineer, primary artist
- Dave Pearce – producer, engineer, primary artist
- Michelle Breeze – vocalist
- Greg Carlin – vocalist
- Mawuli Kulego – vocalist
- Juliet Harding – vocalist
- Rueben Botha – vocalist
- Andrew Chaplin – vocalist
- Brian Chaplin – vocalist
- Tamara Dey – vocalist
- Yoav Sadan – vocalist
- Louise Carver – vocalist
