= In Between (Paul van Dyk album) =

Studio album by Paul van Dyk
- Released: August 14, 2007
- Recorded: 2006–2007
- Genre: Dance, trance, progressive dance music, pop
- Length: Disc 1: 77:49 (mixed), 109:40 (unmixed); Disc 2: 52:01
- Label: Vandit (Europe); Avex Asia (Hong Kong, Taiwan)
- Producer: Paul van Dyk; Alex M.O.R.P.H.; Giuseppe Ottaviani; Starkillers; Austin Leeds

Paul van Dyk chronology
The Politics of Dancing 2 (2005)	In Between (2007)	Hands on in Between (2008)

Alternative cover

Professional ratings
Review scores
Source	Rating
AllMusic	3/5 stars

In Between is the fifth studio album by Paul van Dyk released on August 14, 2007. The album features a wide range of collaborations including David Byrne of Talking Heads, Jessica Sutta of the Pussycat Dolls, Ashley Tomberlin of Luminary, Alex M.O.R.P.H., Lo-Fi Sugar, Rea Garvey of Reamonn, Ryan Merchant and Wayne Jackson. The latter had collaborated earlier with Paul van Dyk on the song "The Other Side". The album also features a vocal sample of Ben Lost from Probspot's "Blows My Mind" on the song "Another Sunday".

The first single "White Lies" was released on July 31, 2007 and features vocals from Jessica Sutta of the Pussycat Dolls. The album is sold as a mixed CD in stores while it is sold unmixed on iTunes and van Dyk's own online store (as the "DJ Friendly Version"), and a bonus track called "Next Generation" was offered exclusively only by pre-order prior to the album's release, via iTunes. It is also sold unmixed on Rhapsody and Napster. There is also a bonus track that is available from the Vonyc webstore. The track is "Paul van Dyk & Starkillers & Austin Leeds feat. Ashley Tomberlin – New York City (Central Park Remix)".

The album reached No. 115 on The Billboard 200 and No. 2 on the Top Electronic Albums and Top Heatseekers charts. The album also reached number-sixteen on the Mexican Albums Chart and number-five on the International Chart.

"White Lies" and "Let Go" have had videos produced and have been released as singles off the album.

== Track listing ==
All songs written by Paul van Dyk, except where noted.

1. "Haunted" (feat. Lo-Fi Sugar) – 5:40
2. "White Lies" (feat. Jessica Sutta) – 4:37
3. "Sabotage" – 3:41
4. "Complicated" (feat. Ashley Tomberlin) – 7:58
5. "Get Back" (Paul van Dyk; Alex M.O.R.P.H.) (feat. Ashley Tomberlin) – 5:23
6. "Far Away" (Paul van Dyk; Giuseppe Ottaviani) – 3:32
7. "Another Sunday" (feat. a sample of "Blows My Mind" by Probspot) – 6:32
8. "Talk in Grey" (feat. Ryan Merchant) – 3:22
9. "In Circles" (Paul van Dyk; Alex M.O.R.P.H.) – 4:31
10. "In Between" – 3:23
11. "Stormy Skies" (feat. Wayne Jackson) – 4:24
12. "Détournement" – 2:20
13. "New York City" (Paul van Dyk; Starkillers; Austin Leeds) (feat. Ashley Tomberlin) – 5:25
14. "Castaway" (feat. Lo-Fi Sugar) – 3:26
15. "La Dolce Vita" (Paul van Dyk; Giuseppe Ottaviani) – 2:50
16. "Let Go" (feat. Rea Garvey) – 6:17
17. "Fall With Me" (feat. David Byrne) – 4:30

== Special editions ==
Disc 2 Special Edition (USA)
No.	Title	Length
1.	"White Lies (Berlin Vocal Mix)"	6:55
2.	"Détournement"	6:53
3.	"Big Bang"	5:26
4.	"Torn"	9:07
5.	"World in My Eyes"	7:55
6.	"White Lies (Count Mix)"	3:54
7.	"Taking The Long Way"	5:53
8.	"Hours"	6:00

- Second CD was only available to those who attend the Central Park Event on August 17 & 18, to those who attended the 13th annual Nocturnal Festival on September 29, or from van Dyk's vonyc.com store (download only) as well as on iTunes Store. It also managed to make its way into stores such as FYE.

Disc 2 Special Edition (Asia)
No.	Title	Length
1.	"White Lies (Radio Edit)"	3:18
2.	"Détournement"	6:53
3.	"White Lies (Berlin Vocal Mix)"	6:55
4.	"Big Bang"	5:26
5.	"White Lies (Dave Spoon Vocal Mix)"	7:05
6.	"Torn"	9:07
7.	"White Lies (Rally Mix)"	6:39
8.	"World in My Eyes"	7:55
9.	"White Lies (Aural Float Mix Long)"	6:31
10.	"Taking The Long Way"	5:53
11.	"White Lies (EPO Mix)"	5:51
12.	"Hours"	6:00
13.	"The Dawn"	5:43

- "White Lies (Berlin Vocal Mix)" – Mixed By Paul van Dyk & Alex M.O.R.P.H.
- "World in My Eyes" – Vocals By Paul van Dyk

== Credits ==
- Tracks produced by & mixed by Paul van Dyk including artists mentioned below.
- Strings recorded by Jens Kuphal
- Engineering by Jonas Zadow & Paul van Dyk
- "Haunted" – Producer(s) Alexander Mieling, Paul van Dyk, Vocals By Lo-Fi Sugar
- "White Lies" – Produced & Recorded Vocals By Dave Audé, Vocals By Jessica Sutta, Written By Alexander Rousmaniere, Jennifer Karr & Paul van Dyk
- "Sabotage" – Mixed By Alexander Mieling, Dirk Ever & Paul van Dyk, Producer(s) & Engineer(s) Dirk Ever & Paul van Dyk, Written By Paul van Dyk
- "Complicated" – Vocals By Ashley Tomberlin
- "Get Back" – Producer(s) Alex M.O.R.P.H. & Paul van Dyk, Vocals By Ashley Tomberlin
- "Far Away" – Written By, Produced By & Mixed By: Giuseppe Ottaviani & Paul van Dyk
- "Another Sunday" – Produced & Mixed By Paul van Dyk, Vocals & Lyrics By: Ben Lost
- "Talk in Grey" – Vocals By Ryan Merchant, Written By Alexander Rousmaniere, Paul van Dyk & Ryan Merchant
- "In Circles" – Produced By, Mixed By, Engineering By Alex M.O.R.P.H., Dahnenbach & Jonas Zadow
- "In Between" – Mixed By Alexander Mieling, Dirk Ever, Marco Green & Paul van Dyk, Producer(s) Alexander Mieling & Paul van Dyk
- "Stormy Skies" – Mixed By Marco Green & Paul van Dyk, Producer & Engineer Paul van Dyk, Vocals By Wayne Jackson
- "Détournement" – Produced By & Mixed By Alexander Mieling, Dirk Ever, Marco Green & Paul van Dyk
- "New York City" – Produced By, Mixed By & Engineering By: Austin Leeds, Nick Terranova, Paul van Dyk, Starkillers & Willem Faber, Vocals: Ashley Tomberlin
- "Castaway" – Mixed By Alexander Mieling, Marco Green & Paul van Dyk, Producer Paul van Dyk, Vocals By Lo-Fi Sugar
- "La Dolce Vita" – Engineer(s) Giuseppe Ottaviani & Jonas Zadow, Producer(s) Alexander Mieling, Dahnenbach & Paul van Dyk
- "Let Go" – Produced By & Mixed By Alexander Mieling, Dahnenbach, Paul van Dyk, Vocals and guitar By Rea Garvey
- "Fall With Me" – Vocals By David Byrne
- "Next Generation"

== Vitas' Russian version of Let Go ==
Russian singer Vitas in 2008 covered his Russian version of the song "Let Go" entitled "Не вернусь" (I Will Not Come Back).

== Charts ==
=== Weekly charts ===
Chart (2007)	Peak position
Australian Albums (ARIA)	187
Dutch Albums (Album Top 100)	48
German Albums (Offizielle Top 100)	20
Polish Albums (ZPAV)	28
Swiss Albums (Schweizer Hitparade)	88
US Billboard 200	115
US Top Dance Albums (Billboard)	2

=== Year-end charts ===
Chart (2007)	Position
US Top Dance/Electronic Albums (Billboard)	25

== Certifications ==
Region	Certification	Certified units/sales
Russia (NFPF)	Platinum	20,000^{*}
^{*} Sales figures based on certification alone.
