= Pascal & Pearce =

Producer Duo

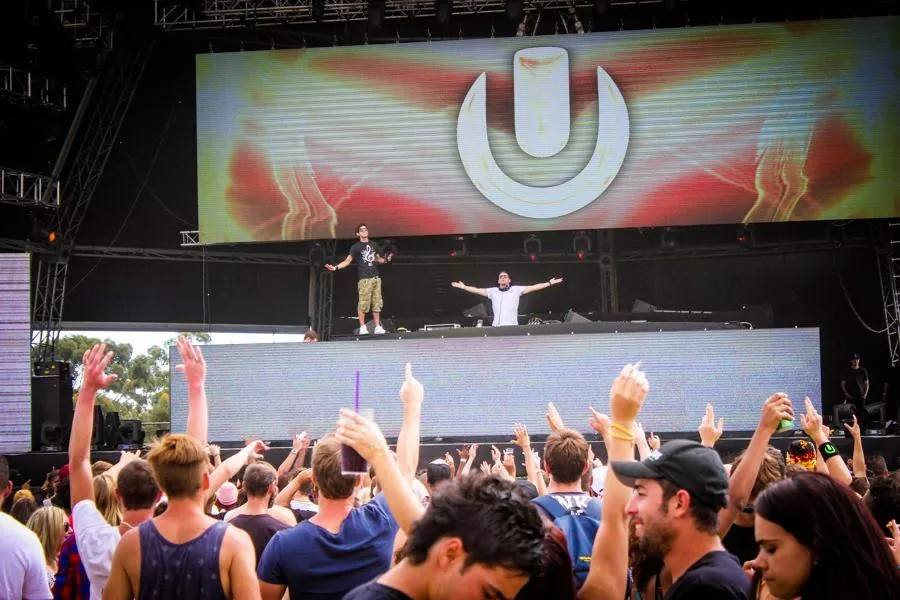
- Pascal & Pearce live at Ultra South Africa 2015

Background information
- Also known as: Pascal & Pearce
- Origin: Cape Town, South Africa
- Genres: Electro house; progressive house; funky house; deep house; future house; ghetto house; nu-disco; tech house; techno; minimal techno; trance; trap; dubstep
- Years active: 2007 - present
- Labels: UMG SA, Just Music, Spinnin' Records, Ministry of Sound, UFO Recordz, Luna Rising Music
- Members: Pascal Ellinas, Dave Pearce
- Website: PascalAndPearce.com

Pascal & Pearce is a DJ and record producer duo from Cape Town, South Africa. The group was formed in 2007, and consists of Pascal Ellinas and Dave Pearce - not to be confused with BBC Radio DJ Dave Pearce.

The group produces a wide range of styles of electronic dance music. They have released a number of albums, including Passport and One Night Only, and have been nominated for three South African Music Awards.

== Background ==
Pascal Ellinas was born on 17 September 1985, in Johannesburg, South Africa. At the age of 12, he moved to Cape Town with his family. After completing his schooling at South African College Schools, he spent a year abroad before commencing his Bachelor of Commerce degree in Business Management, majoring in E-commerce. He has been a DJ since he was 13 years old, and has been producing music since 2007. On 29 October 2016, he married his long-time girlfriend, Sarah Pietersen.

Dave Pearce was born on 23 December 1986, in Johannesburg, South Africa. After matriculating from St Stithians College in 2004, he went on to complete a diploma in Contemporary Music. In 2007, he moved to Cape Town and completed his diploma in Audio Engineering at Cape Audio College. He has been producing music since 2004, and became a DJ in 2008.

== Musical career ==
Pascal and Dave met in February 2007, through mutual friends. After realising they shared a strong mutual love for dance music, they began working together in studio on various projects. On 1 May 2008 they played their first official gig together in Johannesburg.

In 2010, after a steady stream of releases and remixes, the duo had a chance meeting with one of the members of Locnville. This led to them remixing "Sun In My Pocket", a hit single in South Africa. Thanks mostly to that remix, the group was signed by South African independent record label Just Music in 2011. Later that year, they released their first studio album "Passport", a double disc release featuring a mix of singles, remixes and collaborations with various artists. "Passport" contained multiple hit singles, and went on to receive a SAMA nomination for Best Dance Album in 2012.

"Passport 2.0" was released in February 2012, again featuring collaborations and remixes, and also went on to garner a nomination for Best Dance Album in the 2013 South African Music Awards. In May 2012, Pascal & Pearce signed a record deal with international giants Spinnin' Records (based in the Netherlands) for their single "Disco Sun" featuring Juliet Harding from GoodLuck.

The duo mixed a number of compilation albums, including "Passport To Ibiza" and "Ministry of Sound Presents Headliners: Pascal & Pearce", before releasing their third studio album "One Night Only" in September 2013. The single "Desperado", featuring LCNVL, went on to claim the number one spot on a number of charts, and also featured in the top 10 most played/purchased songs in South Africa 2013.

In 2014, Pascal & Pearce were selected for the main stage at the inaugural Ultra Music Festival in South Africa, alongside acts like Tiësto, Afrojack, and Martin Garrix to name a few. February 2018 marked the fifth time that the duo have performed at Ultra South Africa.

In 2016, the duo signed an agreement with major record label Universal Music Group South Africa. 2016 also saw the duo sign a publishing deal with Sony/ATV Music Publishing.

In October 2019, Pascal & Pearce won a South African Dance Music Award in the "Best EDM Record" category for their long-awaited follow-up collaboration with Locnville, titled "I Got Ya Babe". Later that year, their single "Running Wild" (released in 2017 and featuring singer/songwriter Jethro Tait) went on to reach double platinum status in South Africa.

In 2021, the duo founded their own digital record label "Luna Rising Music".

== Radio ==
In 2013, Pascal & Pearce held a weekly residency on 94.7 Highveld radio station, hosting a mix on the Friday Night Bloc Party with Mac G. In March 2014, the duo were signed to 5FM, a South African national radio station, to host a weekly half an hour DJ mix on the "Ultimix". On 1 May 2017, the time slot was moved to 18:30 CAT on a Thursday. In 2021 after a year long hiatus, the duo returned to their weekly slot on 5FM.

== Discography ==
=== Albums ===
- Passport (2011)
- Passport 2.0 (2012)
- One Night Only (2013)

=== Singles ===
- "Paper Skies" featuring Michelle Breeze (2011)
- "Days Go By" featuring Louise Carver (2012)
- "Beautiful Lie" featuring Yoav (2012)
- "Disco Sun" featuring GoodLuck (2012)
- "Desperado" featuring LCNVL (2013)
- "Fire Within" featuring Ard Matthews (2013)
- "Jericho" featuring Jimmy Nevis (2014)
- "Poppin" featuring Da L.E.S (2014)
- "Running Wild" featuring Jethro Tait (2017)
- "Lose Control" featuring Johnny Apple (2018)
- "I Got Ya Babe" featuring Locnville (2019)
- "The Clubhouse" (2021)
- "Like A Freak" (2021)
- "Sky Walker" (2021)

== Awards and nominations ==
Year	Award	Nominated work	Category	Result
2012	South African Music Awards	"Passport"	Best Dance Album	Nominated
2013	South African Music Awards	"Passport 2.0"	Best Dance Album	Nominated
2013	South African Music Awards	"Heart"	Remix of the Year	Nominated
2013	MK Awards	"Disco Sun"	Best Dance	Nominated
2019	South African Dance Music Awards	"I Got Ya Babe"	Best EDM Record	Won
