= Cape Town International Jazz Festival =

Annual festival in Cape Town, South Africa

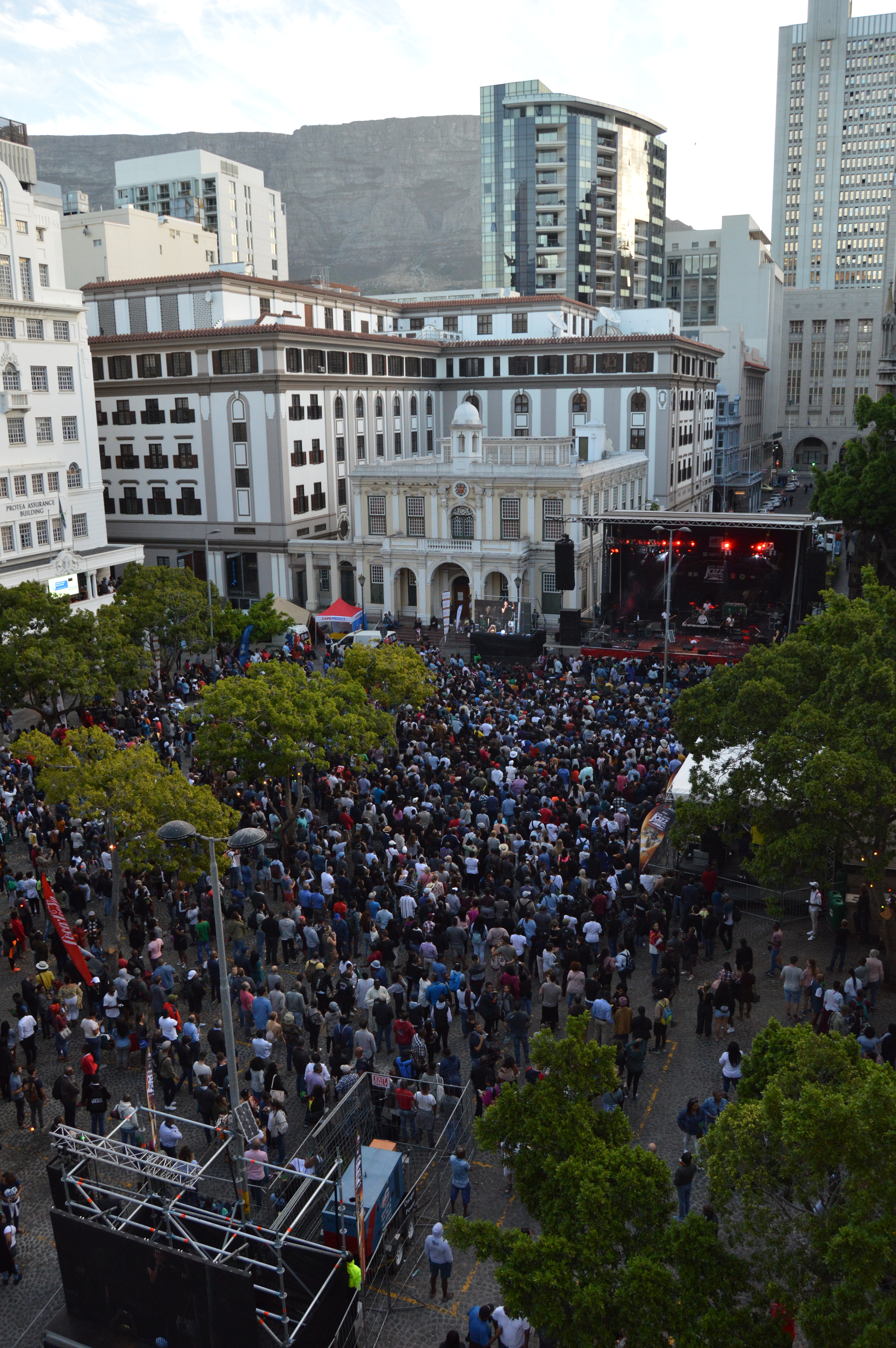
- The free concert at Greenmarket Square is an annual event that starts the festival.
- Genre: Jazz, funk, afropop, fusion, soul, R&B
- Dates: March
- Locations: Cape Town, South Africa
- Years active: 2000–present
- Founders: Rashid Lombard; Billy Domingo
- Website: capetownjazzfest.com

The Cape Town International Jazz Festival is an annual music festival held in Cape Town, South Africa. The first one was held in 2000 to 2005 and is recognized as the fourth largest jazz festival in the world and the largest jazz festival on the African continent. The festival was called the "Cape Town North Sea Jazz Festival" due to its association with the North Sea Jazz Festival in the Netherlands. In 2006, businessman Iqbal Survé's Sekunjalo Investments took control of espAfrika, the company that hosts the festival.

== History ==
The Cape Town International Jazz Festival started in 2000 as part of the North Sea Jazz Festival. This was part of an arrangement that came about as a result of the partnership between espAfrika (a South African events management company founded by Rashid Lombard) and Mojo Concerts BV, the founders of the Dutch North Sea Jazz Festival. It was the first time that a jazz festival with four simultaneous legs took place in South Africa. The festival occurred ever year until 2005 as the North Sea Jazz Festival. Thereafter, from 2005 onwards, the festival was renamed to the Cape Town International Jazz Festival due to the partnership failing. The festival has grown since it first started in 2000, and as a result, attendance has also grown from 14,000 concert goers in 2000 to 34,000 concert goers in 2013. From its inception to 2003, the event was held at the Good Hope Centre but it outgrew the venue, so from 2004, the festival has since been hosted at the CTICC.

=== Lawsuit ===
In 2000, the North Sea Jazz Festival came to Cape Town, South Africa for the first time. From 2000 to 2005, the festival was marketed as the North Sea Jazz Festival as part of a contract between espAfrika and Mojo Concerts. The plan was for Mojo Concerts to provide the necessary infrastructure for a world class African Jazz Festival, so as soon as that happened, Mojo Concerts took espAfrika to court. They filed for espAfrika's liquidation to consolidate a €500,000 debt that had been incurred over the 5-year contract. On 26 April 2005, a settlement was reached outside of court in which the debt was consolidated and espAfrika was able to continue with the festival, now under the name of the "Cape Town International Jazz Festival".

=== Controversy ===
In 2019, the festival was sponsored by Iqbal Survé's cash-strapped Independent Media as well as the Survé-controlled AYO Technology Solutions, which is accused of unfairly benefiting from the Public Investment Corporation which manages the Government Employees Pension Fund, after a R4.3 billion investment that is under investigation.

=== Previous festivals ===
The 2007 edition of the festival was endorsed by then Cape Town's Mayor Helen Zille. The 2010 edition of the festival contributed R 740 million to the Western Cape's GDP. For an extra R25.00 per show, music enthusiasts gain access to the Rosies Stage which features more relaxed, acoustic Jazz Music. Every year just before the main event, a free open-air concert with selected performers is held at the Greenmarket Square.

Cape Town International Jazz Festival by year
Year	Date	Venue	Performers
2000	31 March and 1 April	Good Hope Centre	Herbie Hancock, Youssou N'Dour, Courtney Pine, Moses Taiwa Molelekwa, Hugh Masekela, Busi Mhlongo, Interzone
2001	30 & 31 March	Good Hope Centre	Marcus Miller, Mal Waldron, Zuco 103, Sibongile Khumalo, Don Laka, Bill Bruford Earthworks
2002	30 & 31 March	Good Hope Centre	Spyro Gyra, Ahmad Jamal, Toots Thielemans, Andy Narell, Tower of Power, Louis Mhlanga, Judith Sephuma, McCoy Mrubata
2003	28 & 29 March	Good Hope Centre	Eumir Deodato, Isaac Hayes, Osibisa, Andreas Vollenweider, Jonas Gwangwa, India.Arie, Archie Shepp, Pieces of a Dream, Moses Khumalo, Floetry
2004	10 & 11 April	Cape Town International Convention Centre	Stanley Clarke, Miriam Makeba, Cassandra Wilson, Abdullah Ibrahim
2005	30 and 31 March	Cape Town International Convention Centre	340ml, Cesária Évora, Bobo Stenson, Dhafer Youssef, Transglobal Underground, Dave Holland
2006	31 March & 1 April	Cape Town International Convention Centre	Miriam Makeba, Chucho Valdés, Freddy Cole, Louie Vega, Sipho Mabuse, Paul Hanmer
2007	30 & 31 March	Cape Town International Convention Centre	Average White Band, Gino Vannelli, Leela James, The Stoner, Saskia Laroo, Hip Hop Pantsula
2008	28 & 29 March	Cape Town International Convention Centre	Ananda Project, Gerald Albright, Kenny Barron Trio, Oliver Mtukudzi, Najee, The Manhattans, Zola
2009	3 & 4 April	Cape Town International Convention Centre	Mos Def, 340ml, Hugh Masekela, Freshlyground, Dianne Reeves, Maceo Parker, Peter White
2010	3 & 4 April	Cape Town International Convention Centre	BLK JKS, Rick Braun, Vusi Mahlasela, TKZee, Richard Elliot, Rachelle Ferrell
2011	25 & 26 March	Cape Town International Convention Centre	Al Di Meola, Angie Stone, Hugh Masekela, Miriam Makeba, Herbie Hancock, Erykah Badu
2012	30 & 31 March	Cape Town International Convention Centre	Lauryn Hill, Mike Stern, James Ingram, Zahara, Dave Koz, Jean Grae, GoodLuck, Lenny White, Donald Harrison, Ron Carter
2013	5 & 6 April	Cape Town International Convention Centre	Ravi Coltrane, Steve Turre, Mafikizolo, Robert Glasper, Matt Garrison, Buena Vista Social Club
2014	28 & 29 March	Cape Town International Convention Centre	Kirk Whalum, Erykah Badu, Lalah Hathaway, Mi Casa, Black Coffee, Snarky Puppy
2015	27 & 28 March	Cape Town International Convention Centre	Basia, Yvonne Chaka Chaka, Thundercat, Amel Larrieux, Ringo Madlingozi
2016	1 & 2 April	Cape Town International Convention Centre	Angie Stone, Cassandra Wilson, BADBADNOTGOOD, SWV, Lizz Wright
2017	31 March & 1 April	Cape Town International Convention Centre	En Vogue, Gretchen Parlato, Judith Sephuma, Soweto String Quartet, Digable Planets
2018	23 –24 March	Cape Town International Convention Centre	Incognito, Simphiwe Dana, Miguel Atwood-Ferguson, Sibusiso Mashiloane, Manny Walters
2019	29 – 30 March	Cape Town International Convention Centre	
2020–2023	Cancelled due to the COVID-19 pandemic.	Cape Town International Convention Centre	
2024	3 – 4 May	Cape Town International Convention Centre	
2025			
2026	27 & 28 March	Cape Town International Convention Centre	Abdullah Ibrahim, Jacob Collier, Yellowjackets, Sipho "Hotstix" Mabuse, Nduduzo Makhathini, Tutu Puoane, Jabulile Majola
