= I Always DJ Naked =

EP by Killers & Rockers (Consisting of Avicii, Starkillers & Austin Leeds)
- Released: 19 October 2010
- Genre: House
- Length: 13:51
- Label: Ultra Records
- Producer: Avicii, Starkillers, Austin Leeds

I Always DJ Naked is an EP by the house-trio Killers & Rockers, consisting of Swedish DJ Avicii, and the American DJ's Starkillers & Austin Leeds. The EP is the only release by the trio, during Avicii's rapid success in late 2010. It was released on 19 October 2010 by Ultra Records.

A 2009 studio album, consisting of 12 songs, was cancelled due to contract issues, and later leaked by Starkillers following Avicii's death in April 2018. In 2024, another song was leaked. Starkillers was later in controversy, following private messages, indicating that he used Avicii's death for personal gain.

== Background ==
In February 2009, Starkillers (Nick Terranova) and Austin Leeds, made an announcement asking for a new up-and-coming producer to co-produce an album with them. Swedish DJ Avicii (Tim Bergling) reached out to them, and they started to work on an album. They released the EP I Always DJ Naked in October 2010, and they had a 12-song album planned for future release. Due to Bergling's success, following the release of "Bromance", a song which Terranova later claimed he stole, and contract issues, the album was cancelled, and leaked after Bergling's 2018 death.

== Tracklisting ==
All tracks are written by Avicii, Starkillers, Austin Leeds.

No.	Title	Length
1.	"I Always DJ Naked At the Loft"	7:00
2.	"I Always DJ Naked At the Terrace"	6:51
Total length:		13:51
