= One Night Only (Pascal & Pearce album) =

Studio album by Pascal & Pearce
- Released: 30 September 2013
- Genre: Electro house, progressive house, trance
- Length: 58:59
- Label: Just Music
- Producer: Pascal & Pearce

Pascal & Pearce chronology
Passport (2011)	One Night Only (2013)

One Night Only is the third studio album from South African DJ duo Pascal & Pearce. It was released on 30 September 2013, by South African independent record label Just Music. It features collaborations with multiple artists, including LCNVL. and Ard Matthews.

== Track listing ==
No.	Title	Writer(s)	Length
1.	"Invincible" (feat. Lakota Silva)	D. Pearce, P. Ellinas, G. da Silva	3:49
2.	"Desperado" (feat. LCNVL)	D. Pearce, P. Ellinas, A. Chaplin, B. Chaplin	3:37
3.	"Smile" (feat. Polina Girffith)	D. Pearce, P. Ellinas, P. Griffith	5:36
4.	"Jericho" (feat. Jimmy Nevis)	D. Pearce, P. Ellinas, M. le Roux	3:50
5.	"The Method"	D. Pearce, P. Ellinas	4:07
6.	"Sunset" (feat. Daniel Baron)	D. Pearce, P. Ellinas, D. Baron	3:42
7.	"Viva Party" (feat. Toya Delazy)	D. Pearce, P. Ellinas, L. Buthelezi	4:01
8.	"Leave The Memory" (feat. Quilla)	D. Pearce, P. Ellinas, A. Daigneault	3:41
9.	"Every Night" (feat. Louise Carver)	D. Pearce, P. Ellinas, L. Carver	4:48
10.	"LA Bounce" (feat. KIDFORCE)	D. Pearce, P. Ellinas, R. Raha	3:56
11.	"End Of Time" (feat. Riot Squad & Matthew O'Connell)	D. Pearce, P. Ellinas, M. Kelly, K. Maclean, M. O'Connell	3:33
12.	"Spiders & Giants" (feat. Dirty Herz & Michelle Breeze)	D. Pearce, P. Ellinas, F. van Rooijen, A. Frauenstein, M. Breeze	6:46
13.	"Cyber Freak" (feat. Tasha Baxter)	D. Pearce, P. Ellinas, T. Baxter	3:51
14.	"Fire WIthin" (feat. Ard Matthews)	D. Pearce, P. Ellinas, A. Matthews	3:42

== Personnel ==
- Pascal & Pearce – primary artist
- Pascal Ellinas – producer, engineer, primary artist
- Dave Pearce – producer, engineer, primary artist
- Gabrielle da Silva – vocalist
- Andrew Chaplin – vocalist
- Brian Chaplin – vocalist
- Polina Griffith – vocalist
- Matthew le Roux – vocalist
- Daniel Baron – vocalist
- Letoya Buthelezi – vocalist
- Anna Daigneault – vocalist
- Louise Carver – vocalist
- Matthew O'Connell – vocalist
- Mike Kelly – producer
- Kyle Maclean – producer
- Michelle Breeze – vocalist
- Frank van Rooijen – producer
- Andre Frauenstein – producer
- Tasha Baxter – vocalist
- Ard Matthews – vocalist
