= White Lies (Paul van Dyk song) =

Single by Paul van Dyk featuring Jessica Sutta

from the album In Between
- Released: 2007
- Recorded: 2007
- Studio: Onyx Soundlab Recording Studio
- Genre: Dance-pop; house; techno
- Label: MFS; Vandit
- Songwriters: Paul van Dyk; Jennifer Merle Karr; Alexander Perls Rousmaniere
- Producer: Paul van Dyk

Paul van Dyk singles chronology
"The Other Side" (2005)	"White Lies" (2007)	"Let Go" (2007)

Jessica Sutta singles chronology
"Make It Last" (2007)	"White Lies" (2007)	"I Wanna Be Bad" (2010)

"White Lies" is a song by German DJ Paul van Dyk, featuring vocals from American singer Jessica Sutta, member of the girl group the Pussycat Dolls. It was released in July 2007 as the lead single from van Dyk's fifth studio album, In Between (2007), through MFS and Vandit Records.

== Background ==
"I had a lot of fun working with Jessica. Her lascivious voice and sexy attitude reflects the theme of the single perfectly." said van Dyk via press release.

Sutta also spoke about working with van Dyk:

"It's crazy how the universe works. We were in Germany on tour and we were just talking about dance music and it came up that Paul was doing this album. Before I knew it, I was guest starring on his album. We only had two hours to record the song and he was very professional. He is so sincere and is one of the nicest people I've ever met. You don't expect someone that's so well known to be so humble."

== Reception and remixes ==
"White Lies" received positive reviews.

"Paul van Dyk makes a grand return to the club scene with his new single "White Lies and Jessica Sutta also proves that Nicole Scherzinger isn't the only Pussycat Doll who can sing lead. The combination of these two results in a great song with some great remixes. While only one mix is what you'd expect from Paul Van Dyk, all of the mixes are excellent and worth checking out."

"Paul van Dyk and Alex M.O.R.P.H do the Berlin Mix" – It showcases all of the elements that make up a great trance mix. Synthesizers and pumped-up drums and beats zoom around frantically with the only vocals being that of Jessica singing the title of the song. It's a perfect choice for those late night punters who don't need a lot of singing with their music.

If you want to actually hear the vocals, go directly to the L.A. Mix. This mix uses all of the vocals and is actually not as euphoric-sounding as the first mix. The beats are rougher and the trance element is essentially missing. It almost sounds like a Dave Aude remix. Perhaps his influence rubbed off on Van Dyk for this particular version. The added elements of flamenco guitar and punched up drums make this mix a stellar one. This sound is a refreshing change to what we are used to from him.

"The Dave Spoon Mix" continues in the same direction as the previous mix. The keyboards are the main attraction here, though during most of the mix they overpower Sutta's vocals.

Finally, the "Aural Float Remix" is a dreamy electronic mix, not at all good for dancing to but perfect for a chilled out evening at home. The song moves along lazily and feels very atmospheric, never attempting to do anything related to a dance floor.

== Music video ==
Jessica Sutta wearing a burlesque black outfit in the video for "White Lies"

The music video for "White Lies" shows Sutta performing suggestive dances in burlesque outfits in two different locations: on a bed in a white outfit, being watched by people through the windows; and on stage dancing around a chair, in a black outfit while Van Dyk plays the DJ. The video closely resembles Madonna's video for "Open Your Heart", as well as Bob Fosse's choreography for his "Mein Herr" routine from Cabaret. The video was directed by Steven Antin and produced by Looking Glass Films in Hollywood, California.

== Track listings ==
=== Version 1 ===
Australian CD single

- 1. "White Lies" – Radio
- 2. "White Lies" – PvD Berlin Remix
- 3. "White Lies" – PvD LA Remix
- 4. "White Lies" – Dave Spoon Remix
- 5. "White Lies" – Aural Float Remix Long

=== Version 2 ===
- 1. "White Lies" – Radio Edit
- 2. "White Lies" – L.A. Mix
- 3. "White Lies" – Berlin Vocal Mix
- 4. "White Lies" – Berlin Mix
- 5. "White Lies" – Dave Spoon Remix
- 6. "White Lies" – Aural Float Remix Long
- 7. "White Lies" – Music Video

== Charts ==
"White Lies" has been a success on the American dance charts, peaking at number three on Billboard's Hot Dance Airplay chart in August 2007, becoming Paul van Dyk's highest-charting single. On Billboard's Hot Dance Club Play chart, it debuted in the top 40 in late August 2007, since then it has also hit the number three spot. It has reached number 80 on the UK Singles Chart in August 2007. On Billboard's Hot Dance Singles Sales chart it has been number-one for four weeks. It has also reaching number 38 in Germany's pop charts, number four in Turkey's top 100, number 14 in Finland and number eight in Canada's top 40 charts.

=== Weekly charts ===
Chart (2007)	Peak position
Australia (ARIA)	109
Austria (Ö3 Austria Top 40)	73
Finland (Suomen virallinen lista)	14
Germany (Official German Charts)	38
Turkish Singles Chart	4
UK Singles (OCC)	80
US Dance/Electronic Singles Sales (Billboard)	1
US Dance/Mix Show Airplay (Billboard)	3
US Dance Club Songs (Billboard)	3
US Global Dance Tracks (Billboard)	7

=== Year-end charts ===
Chart (2007)	Position
US Dance/Mix Show Airplay (Billboard)	19
US Dance Club Songs (Billboard)	50
