= Conan the Barbarian (2011 soundtrack) =

2011 film soundtrack album

Conan the Barbarian (Original Motion Picture Soundtrack)

Film score by Tyler Bates
- Released: August 12, 2011
- Recorded: 2010–2011
- Genre: Film score
- Length: 70:43
- Label: Warner Bros.
- Producer: Tyler Bates

Tyler Bates chronology
Sucker Punch (2011)	Conan the Barbarian (2011)	The Darkest Hour (2011)

Conan the Barbarian (Original Motion Picture Soundtrack) is the soundtrack album to the 2011 sword and sorcery film Conan the Barbarian directed by Marcus Nispel starring Jason Momoa as the titular character. The original score is composed by Tyler Bates and released through Warner Bros. Records on August 12, 2011.

== Background ==
Tyler Bates composed the score for Conan the Barbarian who was brought onto the film in October 2010. Nispel had cited several of his scores where he juxtaposed orchestra, choir and non-organic elements fused and had like the idea. Bates thought it to be a hybrid score like 300 (2007), but as he dwelled deeper he felt it responded more to traditional orchestration and had strange musical sounds which was not orchestra, while having ethnic elements in the strings and percussion. Bates liked the hammered dulcimer which he recorded it and lower an octave or detune it above the key to provide a heavy texture and integrate into the hand percussion, thereby working as a synthesizer with some distortion. Even the vocal treatments were similar ranging from pristine, to androgynous and sometimes a vocalist was recorded a fifth above pitch and tuned down.

Bates considered Conan score to be soulful in contrast to the dark and heavy themes he had composed for the other ventures. He added that Conan provided him opportunities to work on themes and motifs, while the score entirely was heavily reliant on percussions and strings in an aggressive way, he also added room for the emotional and epic moments. Taking "Egg Race", he went ahead with a primal but epic sound, and instead of going with a sword-and-sandal approach he did for 300, he went with a layered periodic score having a contemporary edge inspired by the visuals. Since Basil Poledouris' score for the 1982 film was heavily acclaimed, expectations to match the newer score was present, which resulted Bates to treat it as a newer film without that history so he can provide a fresh treatment.

Basil worked on the score during February 2011, despite his initial involvement in October due to the reshoots that occurring that December. A lot of heavy re-writing occurred in the score creation because of the reshoots and edits; Bates admitted the first piece was written in a day and to adjust the piece to match the new edit, it took him two-and-a-half days to rewrite the score without changing the emotional core. He felt the adagios being difficult to truncate as one chord was held long enough to evoke the emotion and speeding up the sequence leads to a diatonic structure affecting the piece.

Over 100 minutes of score had to be developed when the re-edit works happened. By April, Bates had written around 60 percent of music for the film. Bates' frequent collaborator Timothy Williams helped him on spotting the music in other sections. Because of the limited resources, Bates creatively layered with the orchestra to get a grand score. Percussionist Brian Cuccia and Greg Ellis, recorded and programmed the percussions within 24 days which was an assortment of timpani, kettledrums and ethnic percussions. Much of the orchestral percussions were not used because of budget restrictions.

== Reception ==
Jonathan Broxton of Movie Music UK wrote "It's unreasonable to compare Tyler Bates' work to that of Basil Poledouris [...] Nevertheless, one can’t help feeling more than a little disappointed at the fact that a canvas as broad and exotic as Conan brings couldn’t elicit a more coherent score than the one Bates was able to provide". James Southall of Movie Wave wrote "Fan reaction suggests it will take an awful lot of effort for this composer to win people over but anyone able to forgive and forget will potentially be as surprised as I was by Conan the Barbarian."

Thomas Glorieux of Maintitles wrote "This is a horrible mixed album experience that should have deleted half of this music's running time, so that whatever was left of the calmer tracks were at least somewhat capable of putting you at ease." Filmtracks wrote "Bates' take on Conan the Barbarian disappointingly reaffirms why expectations for this score were so low. His odds of success, in part because of post-production circumstances, were impossible. But this music goes beyond just the debate about the Zimmer/Remote Control methodology of blockbuster scoring, sinking below such mainstream muck by replacing the occasional guilty pleasure appeal with a greater emphasis on unlistenable sound design."

== Track listing ==
No.	Title	Length
1.	"Prologue"	2:08
2.	"His Name Is Conan"	3:35
3.	"Egg Race"	2:52
4.	"Fire And Ice"	3:15
5.	"Cimmerian Battle"	3:19
6.	"The Mill"	1:55
7.	"The Mask / 12 Years Later"	3:06
8.	"Freeing Slaves"	2:38
9.	"Prison Interrogation"	3:35
10.	"Monastery Approach"	1:44
11.	"Off With Their Heads"	1:09
12.	"Horse Chase"	3:11
13.	"Death Of A Priest"	2:48
14.	"One Way Ride"	2:35
15.	"Outpost"	7:57
16.	"Fever"	4:47
17.	"Victory"	0:36
18.	"A Kiss"	2:41
19.	"The Temple"	1:55
20.	"Oceans Of Blood"	2:41
21.	"The Dweller"	2:36
22.	"Skull Mountain"	1:21
23.	"Wheel Of Torture"	2:07
24.	"Zym's Demise"	2:30
25.	"Conan Returns Home"	3:42
Total length:		70:43
