= Starkiller =

Starkiller(s) may refer to:

- Luke Starkiller, the original name of Luke Skywalker from the Star Wars franchise
- Starkiller, also known as Galen Marek, the main character of Star Wars: The Force Unleashed
- Starkiller Base, a fictional superweapon from Star Wars: The Force Awakens
- Starkillers, an American DJ and record producer
