= Let Go (Paul van Dyk song) =

Single by Paul van Dyk featuring Rea Garvey

from the album In Between
- Released: 20 November 2007
- Recorded: 2007
- Genre: Trance; Techno; Pop rock; New wave
- Length: 6:17 (album version); 3:43 (single version)
- Label: MFS; Vandit
- Songwriter: Paul van Dyk
- Producer: Paul van Dyk

Paul van Dyk singles chronology
| "White Lies" (2007) | "Let Go" (2007) | "For an Angel 2009" (2009) |

Rea Garvey singles chronology
| "All Good Things (Come to an End)" (2006) | "Let Go" (2007) | "Hallelujah" (2008) |

"Let Go" is a song by German DJ Paul van Dyk, featuring vocals from Irish singer Rea Garvey, member of the rock band Reamonn. It was released in November 2007 as second single from van Dyk's studio album In Between (2007), through MFS and Vandit Records.

== Track listing ==
1. "Let Go (Single Edit)" — 3:43
2. "Let Go (Vandit Club by PvD)" — 9:19
3. "Let Go (PvD Clubmix)" — 8:14
4. "Let Go (Clubmix Instrumental)" — 8:14
5. "Let Go (TV Rock Remix)" — 7:54
6. "Let Go (Alex Kunnari Remix)" — 8:36
7. "Let Go (Martin Roth Nu-Style Remix)" — 10:08

== Charts ==
| Chart (2007) | Peak position |
|---|---|
| Germany | 21 |
