= Hands on in Between =

Hands on In Between

Remix album by Paul van Dyk
- Released: 24 November 2008
- Recorded: 2008
- Genre: Dance, trance, progressive electronic dance music
- Length: Disc 1: 61:43; Disc 2: 52:53
- Label: Mute Records
- Producer: Paul van Dyk

Paul van Dyk chronology
In Between (2007)	Hands on In Between (2008)	Evolution (2012)

Professional ratings
Review scores
Source	Rating
Allmusic	3.5/5 stars

Hands on In Between is a remix album from Paul van Dyk, released on 24 November 2008. This album consists of two CDs of remixed songs featured on the original In Between album in 2007. Selections from this album were remixed by various trance artists in the scene. It also includes the winning remix from van Dyk's "Far Away Remix Competition" featured on Beatport earlier in the year. The winning remix was promised a release, in which progressive trance producer Mateo Murphy was given the honour. As well as a release on the "Far Away" single, his remix made it onto this compilation too.

The title of the album refers to the fact that many people have been "hands on" in producing remixes for songs on the In Between album. Some of the trance scene's current greats have given refreshed sounds such as Alex M.O.R.P.H., Tom Colontonio, Re:Locate, Jon O'Bir, Greg Downey, Kyau & Albert, and Reaves & Ahorn to name but a few. Stylistically this double CD edition ventures into the more popular styles of trance from progressive trance to tech trance and uplifting trance.

== Track listing ==
Disc 1

1. "Talk in Grey (Paul van Dyk Remix)" – 4:36
2. "In Circles (Alex M.O.R.P.H. Remix)" – 8:35
3. "New York City (Greg Downey Remix)" – 7:24
4. "Castaway (Jon O'Bir Remix)" – 7:08
5. "New York City (Super8 & Tab Remix)" – 8:27
6. "Complicated (Kyau & Albert Remix)" – 8:05
7. "Détournement (Jon Rundell Remix)" – 7:30
8. "Far Away (Mateo Murphy Remix)" – 9:32

Disc 2

1. "Get Back (Giuseppe Ottaviani Remix)" – 8:36
2. "White Lies (Martin Accorsi Remix)" – 6:49
3. "Haunted (Tyler Michaud Remix)" – 7:27
4. "Complicated (Tom Colontonio Remix)" – 7:17
5. "Far Away (Reminder Remix)" – 8:01
6. "Get Back (Re:Locate Remix)" – 8:17
7. "Détournement (Reaves & Ahorn Remix)" – 6:10

== The Asian Edition ==
Hands on In Between was also released in Hong Kong on 23 September 2008 again consisting of two CDs, but with a slightly different track listing. The first disc contains the same track listing as the U.S. edition, except for the second disc, which is the CD Single of Paul van Dyk's single "Let Go".

Disc 1

1. "Talk in Grey (Paul van Dyk Remix)" – 4:36
2. "In Circles (Alex M.O.R.P.H. Remix)" – 8:35
3. "New York City (Greg Downey Remix)" – 7:24
4. "Castaway (Jon O'Bir Remix)" – 7:08
5. "New York City (Super8 & Tab Remix)" – 8:27
6. "Complicated (Kyau & Albert Remix)" – 8:05
7. "Détournement (Jon Rundell Remix)" – 7:30
8. "Far Away (Mateo Murphy Remix)" – 9:32

Disc 2

1. "Let Go (Single Edit)" – 3:43
2. "Let Go (Vandit Club by PvD)" – 9:19
3. "Let Go (Martin Roth Nu-Style Mix)" – 10:08
4. "Let Go (PvD Club Mix)" – 8:14
5. "Let Go (Radio Edit)" – 3:17
6. "Let Go (TV Rock Mix)" 7:54
7. "Let Go (Alex Kunnari Remix)" – 8:36

== The MP3 Edition ==
Released on digital format on 1 September 2008 on Paul van Dyk's own German label Vandit, this release only consists of the first disc out of the 2CD edition.

1. "Talk in Grey (Paul van Dyk Remix)" – 4:36
2. "In Circles (Alex M.O.R.P.H. Remix)" – 8:35
3. "New York City (Greg Downey Remix)" – 7:24
4. "Castaway (Jon O'Bir Remix)" – 7:08
5. "New York City (Super8 & Tab Remix)" – 8:27
6. "Complicated (Kyau & Albert Remix)" – 8:05
7. "Détournement (Jon Rundell Remix)" – 7:30
8. "Far Away (Mateo Murphy Remix)" – 9:32

== Certifications ==
Region	Certification	Certified units/sales
Russia (NFPF)	Gold	10,000^{*}
^{*} Sales figures based on certification alone.
