= Killers & Rockers =

- Genres: House
- Years active: 2009-2010
- Labels: Ultra Records
- Past members: Avicii; Starkillers; Austin Leeds

Killers & Rockers were a house-trio, consisting of Swedish DJ Avicii (Tim Bergling), and the American DJs Starkillers (Nick Terranova) & Austin Leeds. They released one EP, I Always DJ Naked, and had a 12-track album planned, which was later cancelled after Berglings' rapid success following the release of "Bromance". The group subsequently disbanded because Bergling allegedly did not have time to finish their planned album.

After their split, Terranova and Bergling began feuding as Terranova accused Bergling of stealing "Bromance", a song which Terranova claimed he had developed. He then raised critique of Bergling's then-manager, Arash Pournouri, for persuading Bergling to not credit him on the song.

== Unreleased album ==
=== Background ===
In February 2009, Starkillers (Nick Terranova) and Austin Leeds, made an announcement asking for a new up-and-coming producer to co-produce an album with them. Swedish DJ Avicii (Tim Bergling) reached out to them, and they started to work on an album. According to Terranova, it was because of contract issues and Bergling's success that the album was cancelled. After Bergling's April 2018 death, Terranova leaked the whole album on YouTube. Terranova was later accused of using Bergling's death for personal gain, because of screenshotted private messages. Terranova later went on to record a livestream, where he discussed the album, and the process of writing it. In 2024, Terranova leaked yet another song, "She's Fresh".

=== Tracklist ===
In order of upload on YouTube:

All tracks are written by Avicii, Starkillers, Austin Leeds

No.	Title	Length
1.	"Away"	8:55
2.	"Days"	7:22
3.	"Far Away"	7:53
4.	"From Here"	8:15
5.	"No Love Lost"	7:18
6.	"Nobody Move"	6:55
7.	"Over Again"	8:06
8.	"People Are Strange"	8:08
9.	"Rastaman Garden"	7:24
10.	"Refer"	7:10
11.	"Round n Round"	6:08
12.	"TotW"	9:27
13.	"She's Fresh"	6:49
Total length:		1:45:50

== Discography ==
=== EP's ===
Title	Details
I Always DJ Naked	Released: 19 October 2010; Label: Ultra Records; Format: Digital Download

=== Singles ===
Title	Details
I Always DJ Naked At the Loft	Released: 19 October 2010; Label: Ultra Records
I Always DJ Naked At the Terrace	Released: 19 October 2010; Label: Ultra Records
