= Rashid Lombard =

South African photographer (1951–2025)

Rashid Lombard OIS
- Born: 10 April 1951; Port Elizabeth, Cape Province, South Africa
- Died: 4 June 2025 (aged 74); South Africa
- Known for: Photography

Rashid Lombard, OIS (10 April 1951 – 4 June 2025) was a South African jazz photographer and political photojournalist.

== Background ==
Rashid Lombard was born in Port Elizabeth, South Africa, on 10 April 1951. His family moved to Cape Town in the early 1960s. Lombard trained as an architectural draughtsman and then worked as an industrial photographer for the construction company, Murray and Roberts, before becoming a photojournalist covering Africa, and, particularly, South Africa where he focussed on photographing the rise of the democratic movement.

Lombard died on 4 June 2025, at the age of 74.

== Early career ==
In the 1980s, he worked for the BBC, NBC, AFP and a number of progressive publications such as Grassroots and South. His work has been part of exhibitions all over southern Africa, including the University of Zimbabwe in 1983 and the Staffrider exhibitions of 1984 and 1985. In 1985 his work formed part of the exhibition and book, South Africa: The Cordoned Heart, Essays by Twenty South African Photographers, edited by Omar Badsha and published in New York. He was a member of the Vukalisa artists' collective which promoted community-based cultural activities.

== Cape Town International Jazz Festival ==
In the mid 1990s he became station manager at Fine Music Radio, and then programming manager at P4 Smooth Jazz Radio. In 1998, Lombard approached the director of the North Sea Jazz Festival to stage a local festival in Cape Town. This was the start of the Cape Town International Jazz Festival. The Mandela Bay Music Festival was launched in Port Elizabeth, his hometown, in 2011 with George Benson playing to a 28,000 strong crowd. Similar jazz festivals have been held in Mozambique and Angola and there are plans to expand into the rest of Africa including Namibia, Tanzania and Botswana.

The Cape Town International Jazz Festival brings more than 40 musicians to perform over two days attracting in excess of 30,000 people. Part of the week-long program focuses on workshops, training and mentoring sessions to develop music appreciation and performance. Top performers at the 2013 festival included the Buena Vista Social Club, Mi Casa, Jimmy Dludlu, Jill Scott, and Gregory Porter.

== Jazz photography ==
Lombard photographed both local and international musicians, and paid particular attention to recording South African musicians-in-exile like Hugh Masekela, Miriam Makeba and Abdullah Ibrahim. In 2010, he contributed to the exhibition at the Duotone Gallery at the Cape Town International Jazz Festival which paid tribute to South African saxophonist, Hugh Masekela.

His book of jazz photographs, Jazz Rocks, was published in 2010 by espAfrika and Highbury/Safika Media. James Matthews, South African poet and writer, in the foreword to the book observed that "Lombard's collection of photographs...is an ode to South Africa's jazz musicians...Each and every lovingly taken photo displays its empathy with the music and the players. As a photographer I don't think Rashid was ever really objective, he is far too personally engaged with his subjects for that."

Jazz Rocks was edited by fellow photographer, George Hallett, who amongst others has won an award for his photographs of Nelson Mandela and worked on the Nobel Peace Centre project. The book chronicles the period from the early 1980s to roughly 2004. It is intended as a tribute to some of the musicians whom Lombard worked with and the important role that music played in the anti-apartheid struggle.

In his own words: "Over the years I have spent so much time backstage that the space behind the music is a part of me. Many of the musicians I photographed were far more than just subjects to me. The musicians became my friends and family. We spent many hours honing our skills and teaching each other the politics of the arts."

== Archive ==
In April 2022, Lombard announced that he had given the University of the Western Cape (UWC) custody of his archive, with plans to digitise it and start an accessible photography centre. Lombard's photography exceeds 500,000 photographs made over a 50 year period, starting in the 1960s. Lombard's extensive photography collection spans musicians and significant music events, high-ranking political figures including a significant portion on Nelson Mandela after his release in 1990, political protests and everyday moments of life under apartheid. Lombard was once the CEO of espAfrika, an events management company which he started in 1997. espAfrika is responsible for staging the Cape Town International Jazz Festival, formerly known as the North Sea Jazz Cape Town.

== Awards ==
- 1986 – Awarded study and travel grant by the African Arts Fund (USA), to be placed at Magnum Photos, New York.
- 1990 – Runner – up to the AFP Picture of the Year Award.
- 2000 – SANEC Winner for Small Business Entrepreneur 2000 Award.
- 2002 – Marketer of the Year : Institute of Marketing Management.
- 2002 – Arts & Culture Trust Award : Arts Administrator of the Year.
- 2003 – Winner Cape Town Tourism Award: North Sea Jazz Festival – Cape Town.
- 2004 – Khula Arts Award for Music: Contribution to music industry
- 2004 – The Order of the Disa Member: for meritorious service in the interest of the Province of the Western Cape.
- 2009 – Sekunjalo Top Achievement Award – Top Performer 2009 Media & Finance
- 2010 – National Business Award Finalist Top Entrepreneur Award
- 2012 – Outstanding and Lifelong contribution to the South African Music Industry: Minister Paul Mashatile and Drakensberg Promotions
- 2014 – The Order of Ikhamanga in Silver

== Bibliography ==
- Jazz Rocks (2010) Highbury Safika Media
