= All Comes Round =

Studio album by Just Jinger
- Released: 1997
- Recorded: BMG Demo Studio and Bop (Rhino) Recording Studios, South Africa
- Genre: Garage rock, hard rock, post-grunge
- Length: 61:21
- Label: BMG Records
- Producer: Peter "Reggie" Bowman

Just Jinger chronology
All Comes Round (1997)	Just Jinger (1998)

All Comes Round is the debut album of Just Jinjer (previously Just Jinger), a contemporary rock group from South Africa. The album was the best selling rock album in South African history.

== Track listing ==
All songs by Matthews/Harris/Scholtz/Tuxx.

1. "Too Late"–4:50
2. "Ahead Of Time"–3:54
3. "Another Day"–4:29
4. "What Right"–3:25
5. "Pretty One"–4:03
6. "All Comes Round"–4:44
7. "Father & Father"–4:01
8. "Shallow Waters"–4:28
9. "No God?"–3:13
10. "All Ways"–4:59
11. "Traffic Light Blues"–4:24
12. "No Idea"–3:08
13. "Stand In Your Way"–3:56
14. "Bit Of Respect"–4:32
15. "Baby Song"–3:31
16. "My Life"–2:44

== Members ==
- Ard Matthews - vocals, guitar, harmonica
- Verny Scholtz - guitar, keyboards, vocals
- Tuxx - vocals, Bass
- Brent Harris - drums, percussion, vocals

== Production ==
- Producer: Peter Reggie Bowman and Just Jinjer
- Engineer: Peter Reggie Bowman
- Assistant Engineer: Kentse Mpahlha and Verny Scholtz
