= Jabulile Majola =

South African musician

- Born: Jabulani Majola c. 1995 or 1996 (age 30–31); Pietermaritzburg, South Africa
- Origin: Cape Town, South Africa
- Genres: folk music; Afro-soul
- Instruments: acoustic guitar, vocals
- Website: jabulilemajola.co.za

Jabulile Majola is a South African singer and songwriter who performs Afro-folk and Afro-soul music. He released Unyazi (2024), a collaboration with Yoav, and Isitifiketi (2025), his debut EP. Both albums were nominated for South African Music Awards.

== Early life ==
Majola was born Jabulani Majola in Pietermaritzburg, KwaZulu-Natal. A few days after his birth, his mother disappeared. He was taken in by a Christian pastor and raised with 26 other children in Greytown. Interested in music from a young age, Majola listened to Ladysmith Black Mambazo, Paul Simon, Simphiwe Dana, Hugh Masekela, Prokid, Zola 7, and Ringo Madlingozi. He was also influenced by Christianity and South African folklore.

== Music career ==
Majola was a rapper for 16 years, starting around age 10. Deciding it was not possible for him to "be a rapper full-on", he began pursuing folk music in 2022, around age 26. He discovered his birth mother's name and began using it as his stage name. At some point, Majola moved to Cape Town.

In 2023, Majola gained attention by posting videos of himself playing cover songs on TikTok, including a rendition of "Skinny Love" by Bon Iver. He released his first single, "Woza Mntana", a love song. It was later remixed by Afro house musician China Charmeleon.

In 2024, Majola collaborated with fellow South African folk artist Yoav on the album Unyazi. The album was nominated for Best Alternative Album in the 31st South African Music Awards. Majola also contributed vocals to the track “Khuluma Nami” by DESIREE, a South African DJ. That year, GQ South Africa included Majola on a list of "African Folk musicians, you should be listening to right now", calling his music "a spiritual experience and a love letter to African tradition".

Isitifiketi, Majola's debut EP, was released in 2025. Majola named the album with the isiZulu word for certificate, in reference to a birth certificate which "introduces someone to their community, to society, to a country and even to the world". The album features 7 songs, including the single "Isineke" which Majola wrote about navigating a difficult time in his relationship with his wife. The album was promoted by Apple Music Up Next on its playlist. That June, Majola performed at the Fête de la Musique in Johannesburg.

In 2026, Majola performed at the Kirstenbosch Summer Sunset Concert with Vusi Mahlasela and later at the Cape Town International Jazz Festival, two performances he considered career milestones. His debut full length album, Ipasi, was released in 2026. It has 11 tracks.

== Style ==
Majola's style, which features the acoustic guitar, has been described as Afro-folk or Afro-soul music. His vocals have been praised as "smooth" and "ethereal". His lyrics are primarily in isiZulu. A reviewer in Daily Maverick stated that understanding Majola's lyrics is not necessary because his music communicates strong emotion. Mail & Guardian stated that he "makes music — not for the spotlight, but for the soul".

== Discography ==
- Unyazi (2024), collaboration with Yoav
- Isitifiketi (2025), EP
- Ipasi (2026)

== Awards and nominations ==
Year	Awards	Work	Category	Result	Ref.
2025	South African Music Awards	Unyazi	Best Alternative Album	Nominated	
2026	South African Music Awards	Isitifiketi	Best African Adult Contemporary Album	Nominated	
