= Orla Feeney =

- Born: Orla Feeney; Leixlip, Ireland
- Genre: Trance
- Occupations: DJ, record producer
- Years active: 2009–present
- Label: Vandit

Orla Feeney is an Irish DJ, radio presenter and trance music producer. From Leixlip, County Kildare, she is signed to Vandit Records and currently presents shows on RTÉ Pulse and RTÉ 2FM.

She has formerly worked as a presenter or producer for i105-107FM, Kfm and Spin 1038. She was nominated for an Irish Dance Music Award in 2010 for Best New Artist and again in 2011 for Best Single.

== Discography ==
=== EPs ===
- Comic Strip / Two Faced EP (2009)
- Lesson Learned / Random Madness EP (2010)
- Bittersweet / Pink Noise (2011)

=== Singles ===
- Orla Feeney - Comic Strip (2009)
- Orla Feeney - Two Faced (2009)
- Orla Feeney - Lesson Learned (2010)
- Orla Feeney - Random Madness (2010)
- Orla Feeney - Bittersweet (2011)
- Orla Feeney - Pink Noise (2011)
- Full Tilt & Orla Feeney - OTT (2011)
- Orla Feeney - Rollercoaster (2012)
- Tom Colontonio & Orla Feeney - New Born (2012)
- Orla Feeney & Lisa Lashes - Mind Control (2012)
- Orla Feeney & Deirdre Mc Laughlin - This Moment
- Orla Feeney - Keltik Warrior
- Orla Feeney - Cosmology - Stripped Mix
- Orla Feeney - Cosmology - Original
- Orla Feeney & Kristina Sky - Audacious (Melodic Mix)
- Orla Feeney & Kristina Sky - Audacious (Original Mix)
- Orla Feeney & Kristina Sky - Insubordinate
- Orla Feeney - Time Out
- Orla Feeney & Kriess Guyte - Vortex
- Orla Feeney & Kriess Guyte - Nebula
- Orla Feeney - Lilyhammer
- Orla Feeney & Kristina Sky - Crestfallen
- Orla Feeney - Comic Stripped
- Orla Feeney - Lust (2018)
- Orla Feeney & Susan McDaid - Can't Give Up (2018)
- Orla Feeney - The Wrath (2018)
- Orla Feeney & Kriess Guyte ft Susan McDaid - U R All U Need
- Orla Feeney - Phoenix

=== Remixes ===
- Giuseppe Ottaviani - Fallen (Orla Feeney remix) (2009)
- Sean Murphy - Open Eyes (Orla Feeney remix) (2009)
- Orla Feeney - Two Faced (O.M.F.G. remix)2009
- Indecent Noise - Cross The Line (Orla Feeney remix) (2009)
- Solid Sleep - Club Attack (Orla Feeney remix) (2010)
- HMC - When The Sun Comes Down (Orla Feeney remix) (2011)
- Nikolai - Ready to Flow (Orla Feeney rework)2011
- Marc Simz - Forbidden City (Orla Feeney remix)(2012)
- Full Tilt - Illuzionize - Orla Feeney Remix
- Tom Colontonio feat Amber Noell - Wish You Were Here - Orla Feeney Remix
- HMC - Hannah & Miami Calling - When the Sun Comes Down - Orla Feeney Remix
