= Sucker Punch (soundtrack) =

2011 soundtrack for the film of the same name

Sucker Punch: Original Motion Picture Soundtrack

Soundtrack album by various artists
- Released: March 22, 2011
- Recorded: 2009
- Length: 49:20
- Label: WaterTower Music
- Producers: Zack Snyder; Deborah Snyder; Marius de Vries; Tyler Bates

Sucker Punch: Original Motion Picture Soundtrack is the soundtrack album for the film of the same name. It was released on March 22, 2011 by WaterTower Music. The album consists of covered songs, mainly by the film's stars. Emily Browning sings on three songs, while Carla Gugino and Oscar Isaac perform a cover of Roxy Music's "Love Is the Drug" as a duet. Recording artists Björk, Skunk Anansie, Emilíana Torrini, Queen, Carla Azar, Alison Mosshart and Yoav also have songs on the soundtrack.

All of the covers on the album were produced by Marius de Vries and Tyler Bates, who utilized orchestral and rock sounds. Director Zack Snyder wanted the songs to add depth, dimension and meaning to the fantasy aspects of the film. The recording sessions began in September 2009. Part of Browning's audition for her role in the film included recording herself while singing. Snyder liked her voice and invited her to sing the Smiths' song "Asleep". The crew and Smiths' frontman Morrissey were happy with the result, and Browning recorded two more songs for the soundtrack, including Eurythmics' "Sweet Dreams (Are Made of This)" which is played during the film's opening sequence.

The album received generally positive reviews, and critics considered it one of the best soundtracks of the year. Browning was praised for her performance throughout the album, mainly on "Sweet Dreams (Are Made of This)". Sucker Punch reached number twenty-two on the Billboard 200, and the top of the Top Soundtracks chart. Internationally, the album reached the top fifty in Australia, New Zealand, Austria and Germany.

== Background and development ==
"The girls in this movie kick ass, so the soundtrack had to kick ass. I really wanted every aspect of Sucker Punch to feel unexpected — the look, the feel and the sound of what Babydoll and the others go through. I think that the music in this film turned out to be such a great surprise, and to really help tell the story in a way that only something as primitive and as much a part of the human experience as music can."

— Zack Snyder

As with the soundtrack for Watchmen, director Zack Snyder decided to go with covers instead of original songs, saying "If you go with the original song, you just get the moment. But if you go with covers you also get all of the baggage you bring to it, [...] I like the baggage. It kind of resonates and rings across time, it's not just of the moment." The soundtrack was produced by composer Tyler Bates and musical producer Marius de Vries. While Bates' job was initially only writing a musical score and helping the song transitions, the composer ended up working closely with de Vries as "the songs and the score just began bleeding into one another". The only track in which de Vries worked alone was the remix of Björk's "Army of Me".

Snyder wanted the songs to add depth, dimension and "meaning to the sequences they exist within", as the film includes "multiple levels of reality". de Vries noted the director tried to use songs instead of an original score "so that the lyrics could help navigate the way through the complex scenes and illuminate Babydoll's state of mind." Bates said "the songs serve as the link to the conscious world of Babydoll" while the score "was designed to simply underscore the sense of reality in the various alternate realities/action". On the song selection, Snyder said that the tracks were chosen to "resonate" and give the viewer "sort of a nostalgic feeling", and de Vries added that the compositions had to fit the film's "themes of escape and hope, and redemption through the imagination."

The original script of the film included parts where the characters sang, but it did not make the final cut, and de Vries said, "It was never going to be an opera, or even going to be a musical. It was very unlikely even to have any 'break into song' moments within it, but the fact that we designed it so that it could I think gives it that sort of strange, music-driven resonance." References to both Roxy Music's "Love Is the Drug" and Jefferson Airplane's "White Rabbit" were seen in the original script, with the former being used in a musical sequence performed by actors Carla Gugino and Oscar Isaac "in the style of a Bob Fosse/Moulin Rouge kind of vibe", and the latter being picked by Snyder for his belief that it was "perfect for our World War I [action sequence]". Bates considers Emilíana Torrini's cover of "White Rabbit" to be the soundtrack's standout. Nine songs are featured in the soundtrack, with Bates saying others were considered and discarded for among other reasons, veto from the original artists and "lyrics too on the nose".

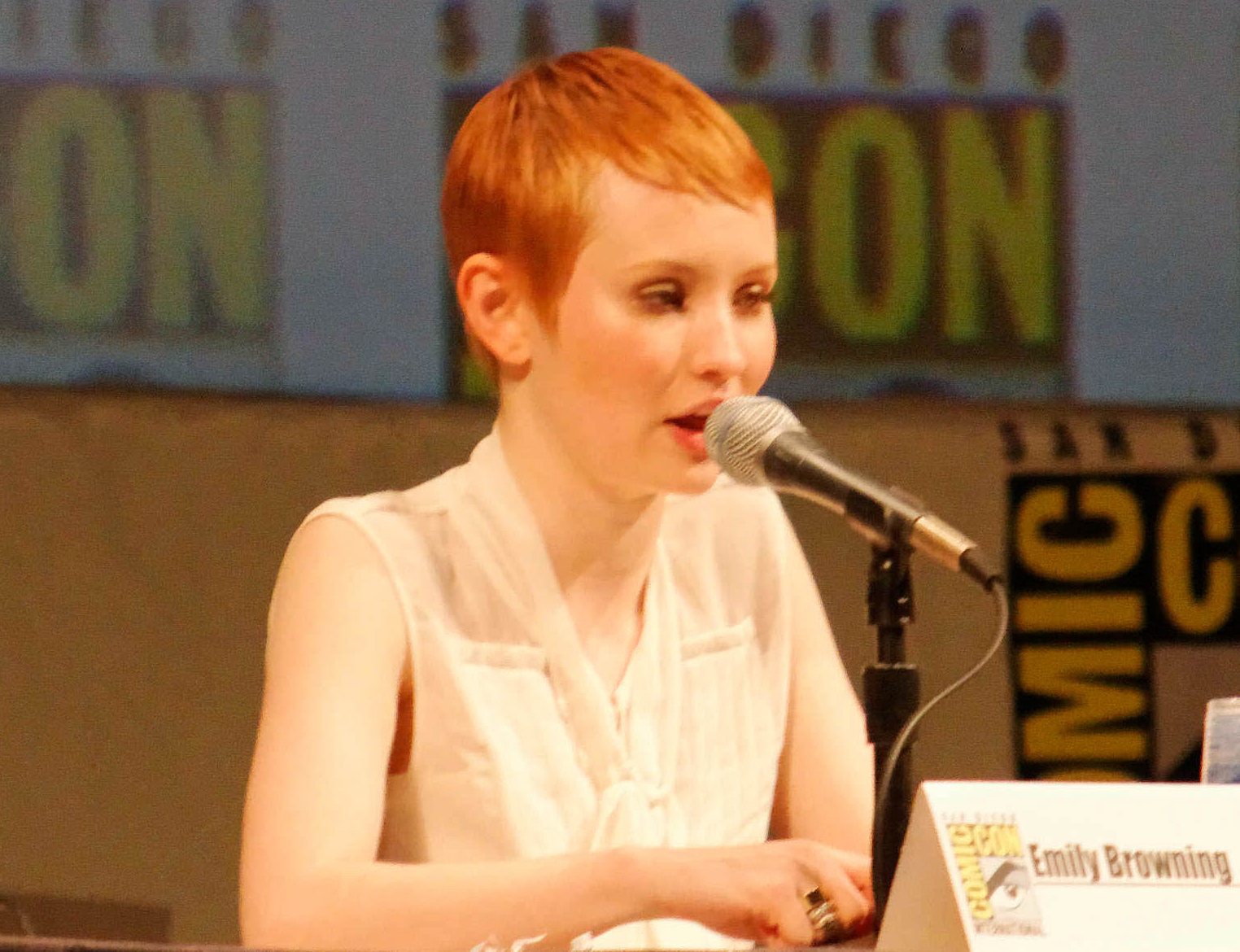
Emily Browning's performance on the album was met with positive reactions from the crew and critics alike.

Carla Gugino revealed in August 2009 that she had begun taking singing lessons for her part in the film. One month later, Jamie Chung announced in an interview with E! Entertainment that recording for the soundtrack had begun. When Emily Browning auditioned for her role as Babydoll, Snyder asked her to sing because of the musical element in the film. He told her to record herself while singing, and the actress did a version of "Killing Me Softly with His Song". Browning later said, "I was terrified, of course. But he liked it. I have no idea why, but he thought me capable of carrying a tune on the screen." The crew liked the result and offered her to sing more songs. At first it was just a cover of "Where Is My Mind?" by Pixies, which ended up becoming a duet with Yoav, but the producers extended it to three songs. One, a version of "Sweet Dreams (Are Made of This)" by Eurythmics, is used to open the movie, and Bates noted that "[Emily's] first line of dialogue is actually 27 minutes into the film so it is an interesting way to introduce her character." The other came up when during a discussion on her favorite music with Snyder, Browning said that the Smiths was her favorite band. Several weeks later, Snyder informed her that he had acquired the rights to the Smiths' song "Asleep", and asked her if she would like to perform the lead vocals. At first, she hesitated, saying that "the offer was flattering, but there was so much pressure". However, she recorded the song and according to Snyder, the Smiths' frontman Morrissey was happy with the result. Regarding Browning's performance, de Vries considered that "having Emily sing—essentially commenting in song on her character's situation in the film — provided an interesting texture, real resonance and depth, and tied the music to the visuals in a way that might otherwise not have been so clearly defined", and Snyder found the actress' "emotional delivery" to "make the songs even more poignant". To work with Browning between takes, de Vries used a portable recording rig on a room with a piano, "a very distressed, out-of-tune, almost-unusable instrument (...) which turned out to have real charm in it."

== Composition ==
"Sweet Dreams (Are Made of This)"
Browning's cover of "Sweet Dreams (Are Made of This)" opened the film and was one of three songs she performed on the soundtrack.

Musically, the songs on Sucker Punch are highlighted with orchestrations and a rock edge. De Vries said that during the songs' production "there was a substantial amount of reinvention, in several different directions", helped by Snyder giving the composers free reins. Bates added that there was an attempt to "expand the scope of the songs in a way they were never heard before", with "crazy electronic" and "alternative guitar work" - "it's a bit over the top, but so is everything on screen." The versions of the songs tried to match the action on-screen: Bates detailed that "White Rabbit" "starts out very ethereal, getting [Babydoll] into the mindset of the dance, and once the girls have their assignment, once they delve in with machineguns and other weapons, the song starts to bloom into this epic, rich, full orchestral choral fanfare." This correspondence lead to the tracks getting longer and alternating between the songs themselves and "a score that is reminiscent of songs sometimes", which Bates described as "playing in the consciousness of the characters [i.e. in the same way most people sometimes keep a song 'playing' in their heads for an extended period of time]." For instance, "White Rabbit" features a choir of 150 voices playing the vocal melody of the first verse of the song, and tracks such as "Search and Destroy" have "moments where Zach really wanted to blow it up into [a] huge orchestra".

Heather Phares of Allmusic noted that "The setting for [the film] may be a '50s mental institution, but the film's soundtrack feels like it's straight out of the '90s." The writer also noted that "Nearly every track here [...] pits female vocals against massive, mechanical instrumentation, underscoring the plight from which the film's characters must rescue themselves." The fourth track, a mash-up of Queen's "I Want It All" and "We Will Rock You", includes rap verses by Armageddon, formerly a member of Terror Squad. Torrini's take on "White Rabbit" includes a Middle Eastern-style outro with guitars and an orchestral pomp. According to Rick Florino of Artistdirect, the "Sucker Punch Remix" of Björk's "Army of Me" is based upon a trip hop production and "repeatedly pummels via the psychedelic vocal delivery and careening, crushing guitars". de Vries considered emblematic of the film's theme of female empowerment having women covering songs originally performed by male singers — "Search and Destroy", and "Tomorrow Never Knows" — during the action scenes for the concept of "the female voice telling the story through song (...) where the iconic original performance is a very strong male performance". The artists who would perform the covers were chosen for having "female voices with enough authority and panache and just cultural presence to come out from under the shadow of those performances, and to make this about songs which both comment on the tone of the scene and also help navigate us across the sort of boundaries of these individual worlds which are part of Emily's imagination."

== Critical reception ==
Professional ratings
Review scores
Source	Rating
AllMusic	3.5/5 stars
Artistdirect	4.5/5 stars
Empire	4/5 stars

The album received generally positive reviews from critics. Rick Florino of Artistdirect was very positive on the album, writing that the film "hearkens back to the good old days, and the film's soundtrack is not only one of the best soundtracks this year, it's also bound to be remembered as a classic." The writer praised Browning's take on "Sweet Dreams (Are Made of This)", writing that it "adds a lush darkness and vibrant vulnerability to the song reminiscent of Portishead's Beth Gibbons but with a flair all her own." Florino awarded the album four and a half stars out of five, and concluded his review, writing, "This is the kind of soundtrack that needs to be listened to from front to back, and if it's any indication, the film is destined to be one of the most mind-blowing and magnificent screen event this year, perhaps even the decade."

AllMusic's Heather Phares reviewed the album positively, praising Browning for "deliver[ing] the soundtrack's most affecting performances". Phares concluded her review with "Sucker Punch is elaborate and sometimes overwrought, but it's absolutely true to the film's aesthetic." Billboard reviewer Phil Gallo described the soundtrack as "a rush of male-targeted female power" which de Vries and Bates scored with "dark, eerie and violent soundscapes". Gallo found Yoav's contribution to "Where Is My Mind" to be "the soundtrack's most tender moment". Writing for Empire, Danny Graydon highlighted Browning's songs as "seductive takes", and praised both Gugino and Isaac for "an exuberant version of Roxy Music's 'Love Is The Drug'" and considering Björk's collaboration "magnificently reversions 'Army Of Me' with Skunk Anansie". Jon M. Gilbertson of Milwaukee Journal Sentinel wrote that "Maybe these covers make more sense in filmic context, but on their own they exude an air of pointlessness. They are, like Snyder's movies, stylish but curiously hollow."

== Commercial performance ==
Sucker Punch sold 16,000 copies in its first week of release in the United States, debuting at number thirty-six on the Billboard 200 on the issue dated April 9, 2011. In its second week, the album rose nine positions to number twenty-two, with sales of 20,000 copies. The same week, it reached the summit of the Top Soundtracks chart, having debuted at number two one week earlier. In Australia, the album debuted at number eighteen and spent two weeks on the chart. With over 117,000 units sold in the United States, Sucker Punch finished the year as the best-selling 2011 film soundtrack. In France, it debuted at number eighty-nine and reached its peak of seventy-nine the following week. In New Zealand, the album entered the chart at number thirty-six and managed to reach thirty-three the next week. Sucker Punch also reached number thirty-seven in Austria, forty-two in Germany and fifty-seven in Switzerland.

== Track listing ==
Sucker Punch: Original Motion Picture Soundtrack
No.	Title	Artist(s)	Length
1.	"Sweet Dreams (Are Made of This)" (Eurythmics cover)	Emily Browning	5:19
2.	"Army of Me" (Sucker Punch remix)	Björk featuring Skunk Anansie	6:53
3.	"White Rabbit" (Jefferson Airplane cover)	Emilíana Torrini	5:07
4.	"I Want It All / We Will Rock You" (mash-up)	Queen with Armageddon aka Geddy	5:08
5.	"Search and Destroy" (The Stooges cover)	Skunk Anansie	4:24
6.	"Tomorrow Never Knows" (The Beatles cover)	Alison Mosshart and Carla Azar	7:37
7.	"Where Is My Mind?" (Pixies cover)	Yoav featuring Emily Browning	6:19
8.	"Asleep" (The Smiths cover)	Emily Browning	4:20
9.	"Love Is the Drug" (Roxy Music cover)	Carla Gugino and Oscar Isaac	4:13
Total length:			49:20

== Charts ==
Chart (2011)	Peak position
Australian Albums Chart	18
Austrian Albums Chart	29
Belgian Heatseekers Chart (Flanders)	13
Belgian Heatseekers Chart (Wallonia)	3
French Albums Chart	79
German Albums Chart	42
Irish Multi-Artist Compilation Albums Chart	14
Mexican Albums Chart	51
New Zealand Albums Chart	33
Swiss Albums Chart	42
UK Compilation Chart	18
UK Dance Chart	27
US Alternative Albums	4
US Billboard 200	22
US Independent Albums	3
US Top Rock Albums	4
US Top Soundtracks	1

End-of-year charts

Year	Country	Chart	Ranking
2011	United States	Top Soundtracks	19
2011	United States	Independent Albums	23
