= Asleep (song) =

Single by the Smiths
- A-side: "The Boy with the Thorn in His Side"
- Released: 16 September 1985
- Recorded: August 1985
- Length: 4:09 (single version); 7:56 (medley with "Rubber Ring"); 4:10 (CD single)
- Label: Rough Trade
- Songwriters: Johnny Marr, Morrissey
- Producer: The Smiths

"Asleep" is a song by the English rock band the Smiths. It was released as a B-side to the single "The Boy with the Thorn in His Side" in September 1985, reaching No. 23 in the UK Singles Chart. It appears on the compilation albums The World Won't Listen and Louder Than Bombs, and on the deluxe edition of The Queen Is Dead in 2017.

== History ==
This song was only performed live once on 1 October 1985, at Eden Court in Inverness, on the final day of their 1985 Scotland tour. A piano was found on stage during soundcheck and the venue management refused to move it off stage. Morrissey performed the song and by the end of it was centre stage in a foetal position.

== Track listing ==
7-inch RT191
No.	Title	Length
1.	"The Boy with the Thorn in His Side"	3:17
2.	"Asleep"	4:09

12-inch RTT191
No.	Title	Length
1.	"The Boy with the Thorn in His Side"	3:17
2.	"Rubber Ring/Asleep"	7:56

CD Single RTT191
No.	Title	Length
1.	"The Boy with the Thorn in His Side"	3:17
2.	"Rubber Ring"	3:48
3.	"Asleep"	4:10

The original 12-inch and CD singles have "Rubber Ring" and "Asleep" segued into a continuous piece with the voice sample at the end of the former looped and faded into the wind noise preceding the latter. Described by Simon Goddard (in Songs That Saved Your Life, 2nd edition, p. 154) as a "spectacular combination" — a suggestion with which Johnny Marr concurs — this carefully executed sequence could only be found on the original 12-inch and CD singles, before the 2017 release of the remaster/re-issue of The Queen Is Dead, which includes the same songs with the same segue as tracks 10 and 11 (respectively) of its "Additional Recordings" bonus disc. The two tracks are separated on all other compilations.

== Charts ==
Chart (1985)	Peak position
Ireland (IRMA)	15
UK Singles (The Official Charts Company)	23

== Reception ==
Professional ratings
Review scores
Source	Rating
Allmusic	4/5 stars

Jack Rabid of Allmusic describes "Asleep" as "lullaby-ish", and the entire single as "great ... just another feather in a jeweled cap".

== In popular culture ==
- Although "Asleep" did not appear on the original The Queen Is Dead, it is referenced several times by the main character in Stephen Chbosky's 1999 novel The Perks of Being a Wallflower, and was also featured in the book's film adaptation.
