= The Stoner =

Swedish jazz group

The Stoner is a Swedish jazz group. The band was formed in 2004 by saxophonist Nils Berg and has released four records. The Stoner have toured extensively in Sweden, and performed at The Edinburgh Jazz Festival, The Jazz Dock (Prague), in Germany and Russia.

The Stoner was awarded the Swedish national public service radio prize Jazzkatten ("The Jazz Cat") in category jazz group of the year 2010.

== Personnel ==
- Nils Berg – tenor saxophone, bass clarinet
- Jonas Östholm – piano
- Jon Fält – drums
- Nils Ölmedal – double bass

== Discography ==
- Upp till kamp (2004)
- The Lektor Tapes (2006, as "Stoner + Forss + Borg"; collaboration with electronica artists Eric Wahlforss and Carl Borg)
- The New Pink (2007)
- Hat Music (2009)
