= Austin Leeds =

American DJ

- Born: Austin Harlan Leeds; 3 May 1978 (age 48); Coral Springs, Florida, United States
- Genres: Uplifting trance; progressive trance; house; progressive house; electro house; psytrance
- Occupations: DJ; remixer; record producer; musician; songwriter
- Instruments: Keyboards; mixer; synthesizer; turntables
- Years active: 2000–present
- Label: Spinnin Records, Ultra Music, Nervous, Hamachi Sounds, Mixmash Records
- Website: austinleeds.com

Austin Harlan Leeds (born May 3, 1978) is an American DJ, recording artist, remixer, record producer and songwriter. Leeds has had a number of entries on the Billboard 200 and his work was mentioned in publications such as Rolling Stone and Billboard.

== Career ==
Originally a guitar player, Leeds turned to DJing in 1997 and rapidly became known for his technical accuracy and black-belt programming. Leeds' work has attracted the attention of numerous major DJs and producers across the globe. Releases with labels such as Bedrock, Zone UK, Bliss, Spinnin, Ultra, Sony, Warner plus inclusion on various compilations amplified his stature. Austin's studio collaborations comprise well known artists and DJs including Paul Van Dyk, Avicii, Nadia Ali, Alex M.O.R.P.H., Starkillers (aka Nick Terranova), Jimmy Van M, Andy Moor, Benny Benassi, Cass & Slide, Mara, Deep Funk Project, Innate, Nu-breed and Origin. Leeds' professional and stylish creations are regularly included on major DJ releases by the likes of Deep Dish and Sasha & John Digweed.

== Chart success ==
The following albums by Paul Van Dyk have charted on the Billboard 200 and feature work by Austin Leeds. In Between peaked at No. 2 on Sep. 1, 2007. It includes New York City by Paul van Dyk, Starkillers and Austin Leeds feat. Ashley Tomberlin. Cream Ibiza peaked at No. 24 on August 9, 2008. It includes This Is What You Need by Nick Terranova and Austin Leeds, Another You, Another Me remixed by Nick Terranova and Austin Leeds, and New York City (Cream Ibiza Night Mix) by Paul van Dyk, Starkillers and Austin Leeds feat. Ashley Tomberlin. Volume: The Best of Paul Van Dyk peaked at No. 4 on June 27, 2009. It includes New York City by Paul van Dyk, Starkillers and Austin Leeds feat. Ashley Tomberlin. Evolution peaked at No. 13 on April 21, 2012. It includes Symmetries feat. Austin Leeds and the album's lead single Verano, also featuring Austin Leeds. Shake Me by Nick Terranova & Austin Leeds reached number 52 on the Dance Club Songs chart on April 8, 2006.

Communicate, a mix album by British DJ duo Sasha & John Digweed, includes 'Force 51' featuring Leeds. The double CD debuted at No. 149 on the Billboard 200, higher than any previous mix album.

== Discography ==
=== Studio albums ===
- 2009– Sound System
- 2008– Dirty Sound II/ Love Machine
- 2008– Nervous Nitelife: Vegas

=== Singles ===
| Year | Single | Peak positions | Album |
| Year | Single | US | Album |
|---|---|---|---|
| 2021 | "Unmuted" by Drwim & Austin Leeds | | |
| 2021 | "The Deeper" by Austin Leeds & Skystone (Danko Skystone) | | |
| 2021 | "I Don't Wanna Stop Loving You" by Loi Alstar | | |
| 2021 | "Lost In A Dream - Eternal Daydream Remix" by Jocce Nilson & Austin Leeds feat. Eileen Jamie | | |
| 2021 | "Oblivion (The Forgotten Club Remix)" by Jocce Nilson & Austin Leeds feat. Eileen Jamie | | |
| 2021 | "Lamazing (Remix)" by Elisa King & Austin Leeds | | |
| 2021 | "Trees (Remix)" by Elisa King & Austin Leeds | | |
| 2021 | "I Just Wanna Tell You..." (EP) by Warren J. Gallimore & Austin Leeds feat. Emarie | | |
| 2021 | "Aventure" by Drwim & Austin Leeds | | |
| 2021 | "Impasto" | | |
| 2021 | "Solo Quiero Decirte..." by Warren J. Gallimore & Austin Leeds feat. Emarie | | |
| 2021 | "Saros" by Tasadi & Austin Leeds | | |
| 2020 | "City Lights (Austin Leeds Remix)" by Maya Wolff & Austin Leeds | | |
| 2020 | "Until The End (Austin Leeds Remix)" by VoColor & Austin Leeds | | |
| 2020 | "Rebel Hearts (Austin Leeds Remix)" by Zachary Ray & Austin Leeds | | |
| 2020 | "Faith" SK Austen and Austin Leeds feat. K.O. | | |
| 2020 | "Stranded (Austin Leeds Edit)" by Ricky Gazetta & Austin Leeds feat. Alina Renae | | |
| 2020 | "I Just Wanna Tell You...." by Warren J. Gallimore & Austin Leeds feat. Emarie | | |
| 2020 | "Tell You Something" by Mizzo & Austin Leeds | | |
| 2020 | "Noche" by Austin Leeds & Danko Skystone | | |
| 2020 | "Matrix" Drwim & Austin Leeds | | |
| 2020 | "New World, Bow to the Dick - HPZMan Remix" by Israell, HPZMan & Austin Leeds | | |
| 2020 | "Moonwalk" by Austin Leeds & Danko Skystone | | |
| 2020 | "Should Be There (Austin Leeds Remix)" by Fabrizio Piccone & Austin Leeds | | |
| 2020 | "Fix" by Fabrizio Piccone & Austin Leeds | | |
| 2020 | "Dissatisfied (Austin Leeds Remix)" | | |
| 2020 | "Equinox" by Austin Leeds & 2 Tall Keith | | |
| 2019 | "The Silk Road" by Monsters and Miracles & Austin Leeds | | |
| 2019 | "Climb" by SK Austen and Austin Leeds feat. K.O. | | |
| 2019 | "Alma" by Austin Leeds & 2 Tall Keith | | |
| 2019 | "Dear Grandpa" by Enrique Clark & Austin Leeds | | |
| 2019 | "No Regrets" by Anna Cole & Austin Leeds | | |
| 2019 | "Head of a Thousand Gallons" by Trezell Lorenzo & Austin Leeds | | |
| 2019 | "Ride (Austin Leeds Remix)" by Reigen & Austin Leeds | | |
| 2019 | "You Got It (Remix)" SK Austen and Austin Leeds feat. K.O. | | |
| 2019 | "You Got It" SK Austen and Austin Leeds feat. K.O. | | |
| 2019 | "Beautiful Faces" by SK Austen and Austin Leeds | | |
| 2018 | "U Started" SK Austen and Austin Leeds feat. K.O. | | |
| 2018 | "Rollin (Austin Leeds Remix)" by Reigen & Austin Leeds | | |
| 2018 | "Fire On the Floor (Austin Leeds Remix)" by Class Jackson & Austin Leeds | | |
| 2018 | "Just a Little Bit (Austin Leeds Remix)" by Anthony Carey & Austin Leeds | | |
| 2018 | "Black Heart (Austin Leeds Remix)" by Vera & Austin Leeds | | |
| 2018 | "Best Life" by SK Austen and Austin Leeds feat. K.O. | | |
| 2018 | "Sequoia" | | |
| 2018 | "Believe" by SK Austen and Austin Leeds feat. K.O. | | |
| 2018 | "Love Supreme" by SK Austen and Austin Leeds feat. Jaqui Bonét | | |
| 2018 | "Gone" by SK Austen and Austin Leeds feat. K.O. | | |
| 2018 | "Waterbending (Extended Mix)" by Austin Leeds & Tom Rogers | | |
| 2018 | "Curveball (Eddie Ancona & Austin Leeds Remix)" by Eddie Ancona & Austin Leeds | | |
| 2018 | "Waterbending" by Austin Leeds & Tom Rogers | | |
| 2018 | "Lost" by SK Austen and Austin Leeds feat. K.O. | | |
| 2018 | "Without You" by SK Austen and Austin Leeds feat. Weldon | | |
| 2017 | "Pilot (Austin Leeds Remix)" by Benny Mox & Austin Leeds | | |
| 2017 | "Kingsley" by Austin Leeds & Kingsley | | |
| 2016 | "Happy (Remixes Pt. 3)" by JES, by Austin Leeds & Redhead Roman | | |
| 2016 | "Happy (Remixes Pt. 2)" by JES, by Austin Leeds & Redhead Roman | | |
| 2016 | "Happy (Remixes Pt.1)" by JES, by Austin Leeds & Redhead Roman | | |
| 2016 | "End Up In You (feat. Stephano Prunebelli)" by Austin Leeds & Redhead Roman | | |
| 2016 | "You and I (feat. Elena Leon & Murky Lights)" by Austin Leeds & Redhead Roman feat. | | |
| 2016 | "The Titans" by Austin Leeds & Redhead Roman feat. | | |
| 2016 | "Everybody" by Austin Leeds & Redhead Roman X Vlad Rusu | | |
| 2016 | "What You Gonna Do" by Austin Leeds & Redhead Roman | | |
| 2016 | "Nothing Safe" by Austin Leeds, Redhead Roman & Didio | | |
| 2016 | "Three" by Austin Leeds & Redhead Roman | | |
| 2016 | "Call It Love (feat. Murky Lights)" by Austin Leeds & Redhead Roman | | |
| 2015 | "Happy" by JES, by Austin Leeds & Redhead Roman | | |
| 2015 | "Survival (feat. CandyBlasters)" by Austin Leeds & Redhead Roman | | |
| 2015 | "Love Me Because" by Austin Leeds & Redhead Roman | | |
| 2015 | "Werk" by Austin Leeds & Redhead Roman | | |
| 2015 | "The Sugar Mama" by Austin Leeds & Redhead Roman | | |
| 2015 | "Make It Move" by Austin Leeds & Redhead Roman | | |
| 2015 | "Roots" by Austin Leeds & Redhead Roman | | |
| 2015 | "Ya Don't Stop" by Austin Leeds & Redhead Roman | | |
| 2015 | "Chasing (Radio Edit)" by Austin Leeds & Redhead Roman feat. Amy Kirkpatrick | | |
| 2015 | "Chasing" by Austin Leeds & Redhead Roman feat. Amy Kirkpatrick | | |
| 2015 | "Stars Like Dust" by Austin Leeds & Redhead Roman | | |
| 2015 | "Soldiers" by Austin Leeds & Redhead Roman | | |
| 2015 | "What U Playin' At (feat. Didio)" by Austin Leeds, Silvio Carrano & Redhead Roman | | |
| 2015 | "Liberty City" by Austin Leeds & Redhead Roman feat. Banger Committee | | |
| 2015 | "Freaq" by Alex M.O.R.P.H. & Austin Leeds | | |
| 2014 | "Exotic" | | |
| 2013 | "My F**kn Name" | | |
| 2013 | "I'm That Chick (Austin Leeds and Mac Zimms Remix)" by Enur, Nicki Minaj & GoonRock | | |
| 2012 | "Close Your Eyes" by Austin Leeds feat. Jason Caesar | | |
| 2012 | "Harmony the Remixes" | | |
| 2011 | "Freeze" | | |
| 2011 | "Netherland" | | |
| 2011 | "Voodoo" | | |
| 2010 | "Northwest / The Light" | | |
| 2010 | "Games" | | |
| 2010 | "Turning Up the Disco (feat. Eileen Jamie)" | | |
| 2010 | "Ahora Leibowitz" | | |
| 2010 | "Rubadub / In the Club" | | |
| 2010 | "In the Air" by Austin Leeds feat. Jeremy Carr | | |
| 2010 | "Pure House Music (feat. Teacha) [DJ Exodus & Jared D Remix]" | | |
| 2009 | "Staring at the Sun" by Austin Leeds feat. Steve Bertrand | | |
| 2009 | "This Drum Beat" by Austin Leeds & Martin Accorsi (feat. Bass Nacho) | | |
| 2009 | "In the Air (Avicii Remix)" by Austin Leeds feat. Jeremy Carr | | |
| 2009 | "Pure House Music (feat. Teacha)" | | |
| 2009 | "Music Around the World (feat. Teacha) [Dub Mix]" by Austin Leeds & Nick Terranova | | |
| 2009 | "All the Way" by Austin Leeds and Starkillers feat. Betsie Larkin | | |
| 2009 | "Revolutionize (feat. Bass Nacho)" | | |
| 2009 | "Music Around the World (feat. Teacha)" by Austin Leeds & Nick Terranova | | |
| 2009 | "Losing My Mind" by Austin Leeds feat. Gina Martina | | |
| 2009 | "Africa b/w President" | | |
| 2009 | "Do It With Me" by Austin Leeds & Etienne Osbourne feat. Steve Bertrand | | |
| 2009 | "Ultra Remixes EP" | | |
| 2008 | "This Is What U Need" by Nick Terranova & Austin Leeds | | |
| 2008 | "Depression / Sad Deluxe" | | |
| 2008 | "Pushing It" by Austin Leeds feat. Deanna | | |
| 2008 | "Holiday" by Austin Leeds feat. Deanna | | |
| 2008 | "This Is What U Need" by Nick Terranova & Austin Leeds | | |
| 2008 | "I Can't Get Away" by Austin Leeds feat. Deanna | | |
| 2007 | "Dirty Sound" by Nick Terranova & Austin Leeds | | |
| 2006 | "For the Pills" by Austin Leeds & Terranova | | |
| 2006 | "Sexy Dirty (feat. Man Man)" by Austin Leeds & Terranova | | |
| 2006 | "Bodyshaker" by Kobbe & Austin Leeds | | |
| 2006 | "Freakshow" by Austin Leeds & Terranova | | |
| 2005 | "Diamond Dust (Unreleased Mixes)" by DJ19, Austin Leeds & Rabbit In The Moon | | |
| 2005 | "Violence" | | |
| 2005 | "Diamond Dust" by DJ19 & Austin Leeds | | |
| 2005 | "Mindkiller" by Kobbe & Austin Leeds | | |
| 2004 | "Sweat" by Kobbe, Austin Leeds & The Land Of Voodoo feat. Oba Frank Lords | | |
