= Just Jinjer =

South African rock band

- Origin: South Africa
- Genre: Rock
- Years active: 1996–present
- Labels: Curb; Sony BMG; Capitol
- Members: Ard Matthews; Brent Harris; Denholm Harding
- Website: justjinjer.com

Just Jinjer (formerly known as Just Jinger) is a contemporary rock group hailing from South Africa. Just Jinjer is one of the top-selling rock bands in South African history, with over 250,000 units sold. Over the last decade, the band has performed and toured with U2, Counting Crows, and Def Leppard among many others, performing both locally and internationally in the United Kingdom and Dubai, and released six critically acclaimed albums.

The band's debut album, All Comes Round, became the best-selling rock album in South African history. Their second album, Something for Now, was certified gold in only three weeks from release. Both albums achieved platinum certification.

In 2004, they performed several arena shows with Counting Crows and completed their own tours in London and Dubai. In 2005, the band recorded their international debut album with Grammy Award–winning producer David Bianco in Los Angeles.

In 2006, Just Jinger changed the spelling of their name to 'Just Jinjer', to avoid having the second word in their name mispronounced /ˈdʒɪŋər/ or /ˈdʒɪŋɡər/ instead of /ˈdʒɪndʒər/. They released a new eponymous album in 2006 with this new spelling, consisting of 13 songs including both new and old material.

== Band members ==
Current members

- Ard Matthews (vocals, acoustic guitar)
- Brent Harris (drums, vocals),
- Denholm Harding (bass, vocals)

Former members

- Sandy Chila (guitar, producer) (2005–2009)
- Simon Bailey (guitar) (2003–2005)
- Alec Bridges (guitar)
- Danie Van Rensburg (guitar)
- Anthony Galatis (keyboards)
- Verny Scholtz (guitar, keyboard, brass, vocals)
- Tuxx Mothomme (bass)

== Discography ==
- All Comes Round (1997)
- Something for Now (1998)
- Here's to You (1999)
- Strange World (2000)
- Greatest Hits (2001)
- Collectors 2003 (Limited copies) (2003)
- Bootleg Album (2004)
- Just Jinjer (2006)
- Milk & Honies EP (2009)
- Just Jinjer (2010)
- Everything Since Then (2015)
