= Yoav (musician) =

Israeli musical artist

Yoav יואב
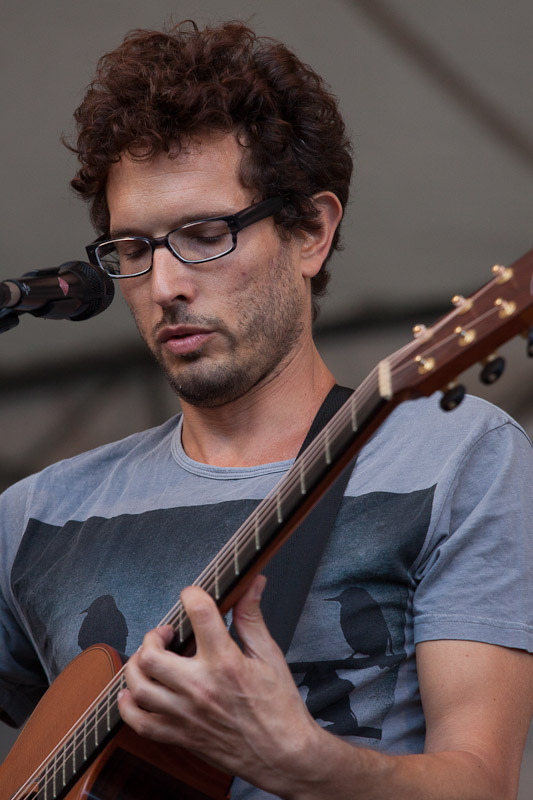

Background information
- Born: Yoav Sadan; October 15, 1979 (age 46); Israel
- Genres: Electronic music, trip hop, acoustic rock, indie pop
- Occupations: Singer, songwriter
- Instruments: Acoustic guitar, vocals
- Website: yoavmusic.com

Yoav (Hebrew: יואב) (born Yoav Sadan; Hebrew: יואב סדן; on October 15, 1979, in Tel Aviv, Israel) is a singer-songwriter of Israeli-Romanian descent, raised in South Africa.

== Early life ==
Yoav's father was a Jewish architect who lived through World War II in his native Romania, before moving to Israel (where Yoav was born) and then relocating to South Africa with Yoav's opera singer mother.

Yoav was raised on classical music, with "light" music being forbidden within his household. He gained exposure to pop music through friends, and was heavily influenced by the bands OMD and Wham!.

== Career ==
Yoav's debut album Charmed and Strange was released in early 2008. His music features his own vocals and accompaniment by an acoustic guitar, which he uses to create electronica-style beats with his hands. He has also released two singles, "Club Thing" and "Beautiful Lie", the former having some success and charting in countries around Europe. His song "Adore Adore" was also featured in "Redwood", an episode of The Mentalist. He also had a version of his cover song of "Where Is My Mind?" featured in the 2011 film Sucker Punch, which starred actress and singer Emily Browning. The song was subsequently included on the soundtrack.

Since Charmed and Strange, Yoav has sold-out headline shows in Canada, the U.S., and Europe. He also embarked on a North American tour with Tori Amos, on which he sold over 9,000 copies of his album in three months. Yoav has also been featured as a "Single of the Week" artist on iTunes Canada. He also achieved a No.1 song in Russia, where he also received a special RAMP award (Rock Alternative Music Prize) in recognition of his achievements. After only one radio session in Denmark, Charmed and Strange climbed to number one on that country's iTunes album chart within 24 hours.

Yoav and Jabulile Majola recorded a collaborative studio album entitled Unyazi; the album was released on June 28, 2024.

== Discography ==
=== Albums ===
- Charmed and Strange (2008)
- A Foolproof Escape Plan (2010)
- Sucker Punch (2011) duet with Emily Browning covering Pixies's "Where Is My Mind?"
- Blood Vine (2012)
- Multiverse (2018)

=== Collaborative albums ===
- Unyazi (Yoav, Jabulile Majola) (2024)

=== EPs ===
- Dopamine (2014)

== Awards and nominations ==
=== South African Music Awards ===
Year	Nominee / work	Award	Result	Ref.
2025	Unyazi	Best Alternative Album	Pending	

== On tour ==
- Yoav opened for Tori Amos during her 93-show American Doll Posse World Tour in 2007, as well as her South African tour in 2011.
- Yoav opened for Underworld in February 2008 at the Roundhouse in London.
- Embarked on his own Charmed and Strange World Tour in 2008–2009, and A Foolproof Escape Plan World Tour in 2010.
- Yoav opened for Imogen Heap during the Ellipse tour in Johannesburg, South Africa in 2011.
- Yoav opened for Katie Melua during her tour in France, in 2011.
