= Starkillers =

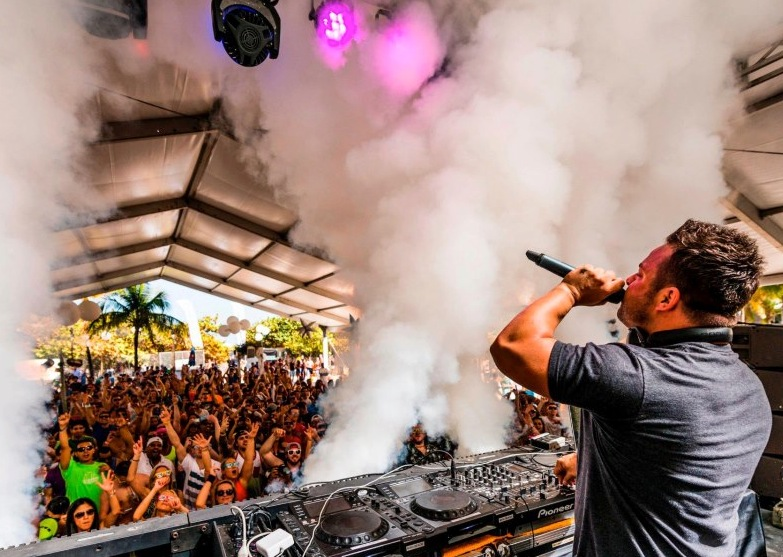
- Starkillers

Background information
- Born: Nick Terranova; December 21, 1977 (age 48); Los Angeles, California, United States
- Genres: Progressive house; electro house; Dutch house
- Occupations: Musician; DJ; record producer
- Instruments: Piano; guitar; synthesizer
- Years active: 2004–present
- Labels: Spinnin' Records; Big & Dirty; Dim Mak Records
- Website: starkillersmusic.com/

Nick Terranova (born December 21, 1977, in Los Angeles, California), better known by his stage name Starkillers, is an American DJ and record producer.

== Biography ==
Terranova began his career in the early 2000s and was nominated to the IDMA Awards 2012 in the category "Best Progressive Track", which he won with the single "Pressure" (with Nadia Ali and Alex Kenji). The music video has nearly 7 million views.

He is the founder of label Terratraxx, which was created in 2002.

Other successful titles were highly ranked in the national charts, such as "Discoteka" which reached the 54th place in the Dutch charts in 2006.

He has performed throughout the United States, as well as, in Australia, Canada and in China.

== Discography ==
=== Charting singles ===
Year	Title	Peak chart positions												Album
Year	Title	AUS	AUT	BEL (Vl)	BEL (Wa)	FIN	FRA	GER	IRL	NLD	SWE	SWI	US	Album
2006	"Discoteka"	—	—	—	—	—	—	—	—	54	—	—	30	Non-album singles
2007	"Scream"	—	—	—	—	8	—	—	—	—	—	—	—	Non-album singles
2011	"Pressure" (with Alex Kenji and Nadia Ali)	—	—	37^{[A]}	16^{[B]}	—	—	—	—	98	—	—	—	Non-album singles
2013	"Ride"	—	—	16^{[C]}	—	—	—	—	—	—	—	—	—	Non-album singles
"—" denotes a recording that did not chart or was not released in that territory.

=== Singles ===
- 2009 : Able & Uneasy (The Real / Unreal Mix) [Terratraxx Recordings]
- 2009 : All The Way (with Austin Leeds) [Ultra]
- 2009 : Music Around The World (with Austin Leeds featuring Teacha) [Ultra]
- 2009 : Get Up (Everybody) (with Disco Dollies) [Nervous Records]
- 2010 : Bitch Ass Trick [Nervous Records]
- 2010 : Cantina [Spinnin Records]
- 2010 : Fuck Shit Up (with Monojack) [Nervous Records]
- 2010 : Insomnia (with Pimp Rockers, Marco Machiavelli, Tom Hangs) [Spinnin Records]
- 2010 : Nervous Tools EP [Nervous Records]
- 2010 : Harem (with Alex Sayz) [Nervous Records]
- 2010 : Big Disco (with Dmitry KO) [Spinnin Records]
- 2010: I Always DJ Naked At The Loft (with Avicii and Austin Leeds) (As Killers & Rockers)
- 2010: I Always DJ Naked At The Terrace (with Avicii and Austin Leeds) (As Killers & Rockers)
- 2011 : Odessa (Bigroom Mix) [DOORN (Spinnin)]
- 2011 : Choose A Name (with Matan Caspi, Eddy Good) [Spinnin Records]
- 2011 : Pressure (with Alex Kenji & Nadia Ali) [Spinnin Records]
- 2011 : Bottle Pop (with David Solano, Dmitry KO) [Spinnin Records]
- 2011 : Beat The Bass (with Dmitry KO) [Sneakerz]
- 2011 : Unbelievable (with Dmitry KO) [Spinnin Records]
- 2011 : Do U Love (with Dmitry KO) [Hysteria]
- 2011 : Take Over [Spinnin Records]
- 2011 : Keep It Coming (with Nadia Ali) [Spinnin Records]
- 2012 : Don't Hold Back (with Dmitry KO) [Spinnin Records]
- 2012 : Light It Up (with Dmitry KO) [Diffused Music]
- 2012 : Keep Pushing (with Dmitry KO and Richard Beynon) [Spinnin Records]
- 2012 : Shut It Down feat. Natalie Peris [Azuli Records]
- 2012 : What Does Tomorrow Bring (with Natalie Peris, Richard Beynon) [Next Plateau]
- 2012 : Xception (with DJ BL3ND) [Spinnin Records]
- 2013 : Let The Love (with Dmitry KO and Amba Shepherd) [Spinnin Records]
- 2013 : Rampage (with Kai, Richard Beynon) [Spinnin Records]
- 2013 : Ride [DOORN (Spinnin)]
- 2013 : Game Over (with Inpetto) [Spinnin Records]
- 2014 : Total Destruction (with Tony Junior) [Dim Mak Records]
- 2014 : Sweet Surrender [Ultra]
- 2014 : Silence [Brawla Records]
- 2014 : Bang Ya Head [Big & Dirty (Be Yourself Music)]
- 2014 : Where U At (with Dmitry Ko) [Brawla Records]
- 2015 : Sriracha (with Dmitry Ko) [Size Records]
- 2015 : Just the Tip [Brawla Records]
- 2015 : It's Love (Trippin') (featuring Proud) [Toco Asia]
- 2015 : 365 (Roaches) (with Baggi) [Brawla Records]
- 2015 : Rattle the Stars (with Baggi) [Brawla Records]
- 2019 : All I See is Red (featuring Nyck) [Self-released]
- 2019 : Red Shoe Diaries - Amy (featuring Nyck) [Self-released]
- 2019 : A Million Nights (featuring Andrea Godin) [Self-released]

=== Remixes ===
- 2009 : Pimp Rockers - Keep On Rockin (Starkillers & Austin Leeds Remix) [Terratraxx]
- 2009 : Nadia Ali - Love Story (Starkillers Remix) [Direxion Entertainment]
- 2009 : Kuffdam - Burning Up (Starkiller & Austin Leeds Remix) [VANDIT]
- 2009 : Robbie Rivera, Fuzzy Hair - The Cat (Austin Leeds & Starkillers Remix) [Sound Division]
- 2009 : DJ Rap - Give It All Away (Starkillers Remix) [MoS (America)]
- 2009 : Shiny Toy Guns - Rocketship (Starkillers Dub) [Ultra]
- 2009 : Myah Marie - Chemistry [Nervous Records]
- 2009 : Armand van Helden - The Funk Phenomena (Starkillers Mix) [Henry Street Music]
- 2010 : DJ Rap - Drummin' n Bassin' (Starkillers vs. Austin Leeds Remix) [Impropa Talent]
- 2010 : Tune Brothers - I Like It 2010 (Starkillers Remix) [Housesesions]
- 2010 : Nadia Ali - Fantasy (Starkillers Remix) [Smile In Bed]
- 2010 : Dmitry KO - I Want You Back (Starkillers Remix) [Masv]
- 2010 : Dootage - Cash Money (Starkillers Remix) [Combo Entertainment]
- 2010 : Mr. Sam, Andy Duguid - Invincible (Starkillers Remix) [Black Hole]
- 2011 : Memento, Ken Spector - Enjoy The Silence feat. Ken Spector (Starkillers Remix) [Big & Dirty]
- 2011 : Jerome Isma-Ae, Daniel Portman, Max'C - Flashing Lights feat. Max'C (Starkillers Remix) [Big & Dirty]
- 2011 : Melleefresh, Dirty 30 - Beautiful, Rich & Horny (Starkillers Butterfly Terrace Vocal Mix) [Play Digital]
- 2011 : Richard Beynon - Close To You (Starkillers Butterfly Terrace Mix) [Perfecto]
- 2012 : Stafford Brothers - Falling (Starkillers Remix) [Astrx]
- 2012 : Melleefresh, Deadmau5 - Hey Baby (Starkillers & Dmitry KO Club Mix) [Play Digital]
- 2012 : Serge Devant - True Faith (Starkillers Remix) [Ultra]
- 2012 : Steven Ray - Unexpected (Starkillers Remix) [Housesession]
- 2012 : David Solano, Brass Knuckles - Closure (Starkillers & Dmitry KO Mix) [Juicy Music]
- 2012 : Pascal & Pearce, Juliet Harding - Disco Sun (Starkillers Remix) [Spinnin]
- 2012 : Loleatta Holloway - Love Sensation (Starkillers & Dmitry KO Remix) [Ultra]
- 2012 : Olav Basoski - The Rain (Starkillers Remix) [Spinnin Records]
- 2012 : Lisa Millett, Juan Kidd, Felix Baumgartner - Now You're Gone (Starkillers & Dmitry KO Remix)
- 2013 : Pitbull, David Rush, Mr. 305 - All Night (Starkillers Remix) [Ultra]
- 2013 : Nick Skitz, Akon - Natural Born Hustla (Starkillers Remix) [LNG Music]
- 2013 : Armin van Buuren, NERVO, Laura V. - Turn This Love Around (Starkillers Remix) [Armada]
- 2014 : David Guetta feat. Skylar Grey - Shot Me Down (Starkillers F.U.I.F Remix)
- 2014 : Akon, Just Ivy - Paradise (Extended Starkillers Club Mix) [Black Pearl Records]
- 2014 : Fagault & Marina, Mandy Jiroux - Tonight (Starkillers Remix) [Peace Bisquit]
- 2015 : BEATON3, Tight Lexor - Olympus (Starkillers Edit) [Brawla Records]
