= Vandit =

German record label

- Founded: 1999
- Founder: Paul van Dyk
- Genre: Dance music; trance; progressive house; techno
- Country of origin: Germany
- Location: Berlin, Germany
- Official website: www.vandit.com

Vandit Records is a German record label founded in 1999 by Paul van Dyk. Its first release was van Dyk's own tracks "Another Way" and "Avenue". The Berlin-based record label is largely focused on trance and progressive house. The label has been known for hosting large concert parties in Berlin.

In 2013 they signed a digital distribution and video deal with Believe Digital. In May 2015, the label celebrated their 15th anniversary with the digital release The Best of VANDIT and an associated club tour.

== Current artists ==
- Alex M.O.R.P.H
- Ben Nicky
- Bryan Kearney
- Filo & Peri
- Giuseppe Ottaviani
- Heatbeat
- Jordan Suckley
- Judge Jules
- Orla Feeney
- The Thrillseekers
- Matt Noland

== See also ==
- List of record labels
