= GoodLuck =

South African electronic music trio est.2011

- Origin: Cape Town, South Africa
- Genres: Electronic, pop, dance
- Labels: Sony Music, Armada, Get Lucky Records, Ultra Records
- Members: Ben Peters; Juliet Harding; Tim Welsh
- Past members: Raiven Hansmann; Matthew O'Connell
- Website: www.goodlucklive.com

GoodLuck is a South African electronic music band. The electronic group was first formed in 2011 by Ben Peters and Juliet Harding (both former jacSharp band members), GoodLuck are known for their blend of instrumentation with electronic dance music with an African edge.

In 2015, GoodLuck won 'Best Pop' album at the South African Music Awards for their album The Creatures of the Night. GoodLuck have their own concert series (Get Lucky Summer), their own record label (Get Lucky Records) and GoodLuck Cares Foundation. Previous members include Raiven Hansmann and Matthew O'Connell.

== Band members ==
- Ben Peters: producer and drummer
- Juliet Harding: lyricist and vocalist
- Tim Welsh: saxophone and keyboardist

== Career ==
May 2011: Support act for The Perfecto Featuring Paul Oakenfold Tour

2013: GoodLuck recorded their second album, Creatures of the Night, in the Namibian desert using solar-powered technology to record the album and natural 'found sounds' like the vocals of a zebra, ocean sounds and using the Fish River Canyon to create sound delays. This Might Sound Crazy is a feature-length documentary of the recording process and was launched at Amsterdam Dance Event 2013. Goodluck was invited to present a master class at Amsterdam Dance Event about their recording and production process using abstract environmental sounds to produce a commercial album.

May 2015: Opened for German DJ Robin Schultz's Sound of Light dance events in South Africa.

September 2015: GoodLuck was selected to open for Pharrell Williams as a part of his world tour.

October 2015: GoodLuck released their single, Back in the Day, with Dutch electronic music producer, De Hofnar.

January 2016: Opened for British band Clean Bandit at Electric Summer in South Africa.

April 2016: Support act for British band Jungle at Kirstenbosch Botanical Gardens.

March 2018: Performed as a headliner at Ultra South Africa.

== Discography ==
=== Singles ===
- Taking It Easy (2011)
- Hop On/Hop Off (2012)
- The Vision (2012)
- Trickery (2013) (Trickery is the first single off the Creatures of The Night album.)
- What Would We Be (featuring Lisa Kekaula) (2014)
- Back in the Day (with De Hofnar) (2015)
- Thinking About You (2016) (A cover of 90s pop hit by London Beats.)
- Find Me in the Forest (2016)
- The Open Sea (2017) (Recorded with German duo, Younotus.)
- Fading – ft DJ Ganyani (2017)
- Chasing Dreams (2018)
- Be Yourself – ft Boris Smith (2018)
- Waiting for You – ft DJ Ganyani (2019)
- What Next (2020)
- Rum & Cola – ft Kav Verhouzer (2020)

=== Albums ===
- GoodLuck (2011)
- Creatures of the Night (2014)
- The Nature Within (2016)
