= Locnville =

South African hip hop band

- Born: Andrew Chaplin; Brian Chaplin; 14 May 1990 (age 36); New York City, United States
- Origin: Cape Town, Western Cape, South Africa
- Genres: Pop, electro, hip hop
- Labels: ContraBanned; Just Music; Sony Music Entertainment; Jive Records (Worldwide); Epic Records (UK) Warner Music South Africa
- Members: Andrew Chaplin; Brian Chaplin
- Website: locnville.com

Locnville (sometimes abridged as LCNVL) is a South African electro hop music duo. Identical twin brothers Andrew and Brian Chaplin formed Locnville in Cape Town, South Africa, in 2009. The twins are singer-songwriters, song producers and musicians, in addition to being guitarists, drummers and business entrepreneurs.

Their debut studio album titled Sun in My Pocket was released in South Africa in February 2010 and had proven to become a major success, peaking at No. 1 on the RISA South African Albums Chart and later winning them the award for "best newcomer" at the 2010 MK Awards.

Their second studio album titled Running To Midnight was released on 1 July 2011, including a high-definition music video for one of the album's tracks titled "Stars Above You".

The twins released their third studio album titled Taste the Weekend on 17 June 2016.

== Life and career ==
=== 1990–98: Early years ===
Andrew and Brian Chaplin were born identical twin brothers in New York, United States on 14 May 1990 to Pam Eichner, an American actress, and Spencer Chaplin, a guitarist. At the age of two they relocated to Cape Town, South Africa, where the family lived together until their parents' divorce in 1997. The twins then started spending alternate weeks with either parent. They returned eventually to the United States in 2001 with their mother and finally moved back to South Africa in 2003 to live with their father. Andrew and Brian discovered their passion for music at the age of six when they got their first guitars. The twins regard the bands Pink Floyd and Oasis as big influences whose music was regularly played by their parents. Andrew elaborated in an interview: "Our family was pretty musically orientated, so I think we got a pretty good sense of melody and rhythm from a young age." The twins went to Reddam House Constantia from grade 1 to 12

=== 2006–2009: "III" ===
At a young age the twins started performing at events in and around Cape Town and it didn't take long before they were discovered by South African record producer Gabi Le Roux who introduced them to Khayelitsha-based artist Given Phike. Soon the twins and Given Phike created the musical trio III (Three).

On 27 August 2007, III released a twelve track album, titled What They Say, on a South African mobile phone based social networking application called MXit. They were the first group in South Africa to release music in this format and in this sense made local music history.

The group disbanded soon after and Andrew and Brian Chaplin went on to create Locnville, the name of which is still a mystery, however the twins did say it has to do with their background and the fact that they had lived in both the United States and South Africa.

=== Sun in My Pocket (2010) ===
After three months of pre- and post production by Deon Phyfer including two weeks of recording, mixing and mastering at LMX Studios in Cape Town their debut album, Sun in My Pocket was originally released on a music download format with the original title of Retro Electro in November 2009. The CD format of Sun in My Pocket was later released in South Africa in February 2010 after being remastered in the UK by Wez Clarke (Ministry of Sound, Hed Kandi).

Locnville were later deemed the "buzz act" at the Midem International Music Conference in Cannes in January 2010, sparking interest in the duo from international record labels. In May 2010 it was announced that Locnville signed a worldwide deal with Sony Music International.

During September 2010, the twins visited the United Kingdom where they met their fans and worked on their materials. The single "Sun in My Pocket" is also featured in EA Sports game, FIFA 11.

Locnville was also featured on an episode of the popular MTV series My Super Sweet World Class. They were in the episode, gifting tickets and backstage passes to one of their concerts to birthday girl, Nina Rykaart, of South Africa.

=== Running to Midnight (2011) ===
On 1 July 2011, Locnville released their second studio album titled Running To Midnight. The brothers started an official "one-hundred day countdown", a move made to create a hype towards the build-up of the release. The move proved to be a successful one with social media networks, including Facebook and Twitter, being abuzz with the news of its release. Various competitions to encourage the purchasing of Running To Midnight were also created. The first single is called 'Stars Above You'.

The new album was written and recorded over 9 months in Cape Town, the US, and whilst on the road promoting their debut album across Europe.

In an interview, one of the twins, Andrew, stated that the new album was "much more relevant to where we are now". The other twin, Brian, added that the new album is "not our previous album"; saying in so many words that the new album brought with it new sound and "a seriously intense and fun story".

=== Faster Longer Mixtape (2013) ===
On 8 October 2013, Locnville released a mixtape titled Faster Longer Mixtape. "Closer" is the first single from Faster Longer Mixtape and it features singer Lakota Silva. "Yesterday" is the second single off of their Faster Longer Mixtape which they have described as a new sound for them as well as precursor for what's to come. They spent some time in New York at the end of 2012 and recorded 16 tracks in a week.

=== The Odyssey (2013) ===
On 24 December 2013, Locnville released an album titled The Odyssey containing 13 tracks. The album features guest collaborations with Reason, Lakota Silva, Mathew Gold, Pascal & Pearce, Tailor and Ross Jack.

=== Locnville vs LCNVL - The Hits (2015) ===
On 4 December 2015, Locnville released their greatest hits album titled The Hits. Containing 16 tracks.

=== Taste The Weekend (2016) ===
On 17 June 2016, Locnville released their third studio album titled Taste the Weekend. "Grapevine" is the first single from Taste the Weekend. "Grapevine", which was mixed and mastered by Ariel Chobaz (Justin Bieber, Drake & Nicki Minaj) and features vocals by Sabi (who has worked with Tyga, Britney Spears & Chris Brown) made its debut on Apple Music and Beats Radio on 12 February 2016 worldwide. "Cold Shoulder" co-produced with Sketchy Bongo, will be the second single from this album.

Taste the Weekend will be Locnville's first album with Warner Music South Africa. Having recorded half of the album over a period of five months in the US, and going back to their first name Locnville instead of LCNVL, the twins are excited for South African fans to hear the new sound.

=== Tribes & Angels (2020) ===
On 7 January 2020, Locnville celebrated the beginning of a new era with their latest offering Tribes & Angels. The EP that consists of 5 songs and will feature four guests – indie artists Muzi Mnisi who now resides in Atlanta, Georgia, 19-year-old Cape Town-based Anica Kiana, Swaziland's Apple Gule and popular hip-hop lyricist Gigi Lamayne. Andrew added the following about the EP, "Tribes & Angels is our first release in a while and a lead up to our next full-length LP to mark our first decade in the industry which is a huge milestone."

=== Entrepreneurship: Contra-Banned and Villey clothing ===
==== Contra-Banned ====
When creating Locnville, the twins also decided to create their own record label called Contra-Banned that would distribute their music at the time on a so-called "VirtualCD" format. They later on stated that the reason for creating Contra-Banned was that "artists get a tiny percentage at the end of it all...”, and they felt this was unfair as they put a lot of time and effort into what they did.

==== Villey clothing ====
The official logo of Villey Clothing by Locnville

In December 2010, the twin brothers released their own clothing brand called Villey clothing. Currently available for online purchase at TheGreekMerchant.com.

== Discography ==
- Retro Electro / Sun in My Pocket (2010)
- Running to Midnight (2011)
- Faster Longer Mixtape (2013)
- The Odyssey (2013)
- "Locnville vs LCNVL" - The Hits (2015)
- "Taste The Weekend" (2016)
- "Tribes & Angels" (2020)
- "The Burn Box" (2021)

=== Singles ===
- "Sun in My Pocket" (2009)
- "6 Second Poison" (2010)
- "There" (2010)
- "Love Rush" (2010)
- "Passion to Go" (radio single) (2011)
- "Stars Above You" (2011)
- "Staring at the World Outside" (2011)
- "The Good Guy" (2012)
- "Closer" (2013)
- "Yesterday" (2013)
- "Desperado" (Pascal & Pearce feat. Locnville) (2013)
- "Dreamcatcher" featuring Tailor (2013)
- "Pop Ya Like A" featuring Reason and Lakota Silva (2014)
- "Wasted" with Chad Da Don (2014)
- "I Can't Sleep" (2015)
- "Grapevine" featuring Sabi (2016)
- "Cold Shoulder" featuring Sketchy Bongo (2016)
- "Taste the Weekend II" featuring Roxy & Rouge (2016)
- "Hold on You" by Chad Da Don featuring Locnville (2016)
- "Blue Moon by Sketchy Bongo featuring Locnville (2017)
- "Done" featuring Radio & Weasel (2017)
- "Better With Silence" Locnville, AirDee, and YoungstaCPT (2018)
- "Liquid Cocaine" by DJ Qness (feat. Locnville and K.O) (2018)
- "Baloo" (2018)
- "Lemon Moon" (2018)
- "I Got Ya Babe" by Pascal & Pearce featuring Locnville (2019)
- "Little Less Liquor (featuring Anica Kiana)" (2019)
- "Liquid Cocaine" by De Hofnar x Giocatori featuring Locnville (2019)
- "New Rich" by Chad Da Don (feat. Locnville) (2019)
- "Paid" (2019)
- "95 Skyline" Sketchy Bongo (feat. Locnville) (2020)
- "Tribes & Angels" (featuring Muzi Mnisi) (2020)
- "Miracles" (Featuring Apple Gule) - Remix (2020)
- "Trophy" (feat. Khumz) (2021)
- "Cadillac" (2021)
- "When the Sun Goes Down" vs Pascal & Pearce (2021)
- "I Got Ya Babe" Locnville and Pascal & Pearce (2021)
- "Desperado" Pascal & Pearce x Locnville (2021)
- "Tattoos" (2021)
- "Broken Telephone" Locnville and Pascal & Pearce (2022)
- "Heartless" Francis Turner & Locnville (2022)
- "90's Sad Boy" (2023)
- "Be My Love" Locnville and Max Hurrel (2023)
- "Show Me Love (feat. Hannah Ray) (2025)
- "Déjà Vu" Locnville and Sketchy Bongo (2026)
- "Hell or High Water" Amadé and Locnville (2026)

== Awards and nominations ==
Year	Nominee / work	Award	Result
2010	Sopot Hit Festival	Foreign Hit Years	11 place
2010	"Sun in My Pocket"	Best Newcomer (MK Music Awards)	Won
2011	"Sun in My Pocket"	Best Newcomer (SAMAs)	Won
2011		Best Selling Album (SAMAs)	Won
2013	Locnville	Best African Act (MTV Europe Music Awards)	Won
2014	Locnville	Best Pop (MTV Africa Music Awards 2014)	Nominated
