= Jessica Sutta discography =

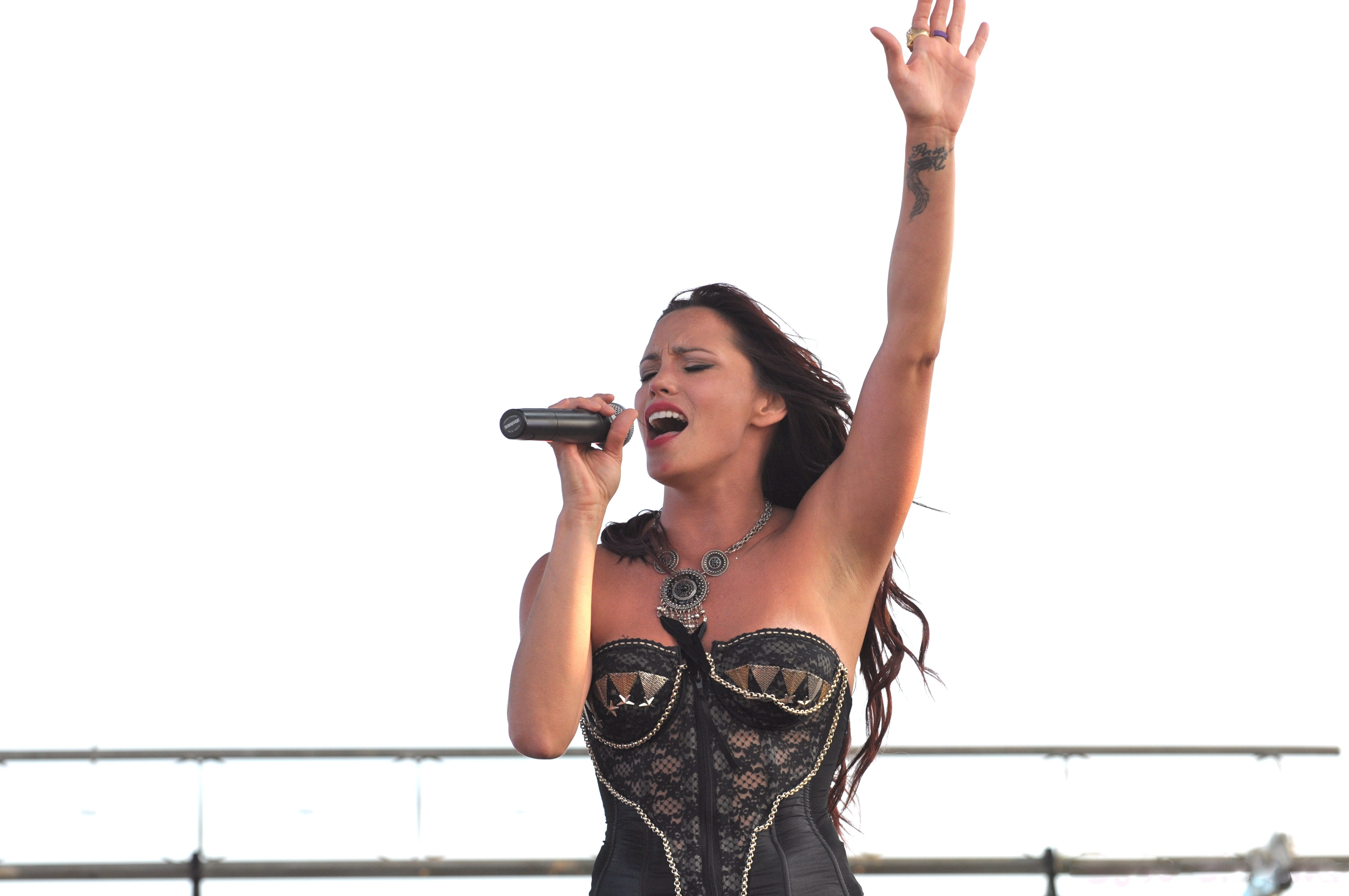
- Sutta in 2012.
- Studio albums: 1
- Singles: 23
- Music videos: 19
- Featured singles: 8

American singer Jessica Sutta has released one studio album, and twenty-three singles, eight as a featured artist and two promotional single. Sutta shelved her first attempt with a debut album, Sutta Pop (2012), subsequently starting the project named Feline Resurrection, released as a mixtape in 2016, until releasing the studio album I Say Yes (2017). Reached four number ones on US Dance Club Songs ("Show Me", "Make It Last", "I'm Gonna Get You" and "Distortion"), becoming the only former The Pussycat Dolls' member to reach the top of an American chart.

== Albums ==
=== Studio albums ===
Title	Album details
I Say Yes (Note: as J Sutta)	Released: March 3, 2017; Label: Premier League Music; Format: CD, digital download

=== Mixtapes ===
Title	Album details
Feline Resurrection	Released: June 9, 2016 (Note: Feline Resurrection had individual releases of its tracks. The date indicates the release of the project's last track.); Label: Self-released; Format: Digital download

== Singles ==
=== As main artist ===
List of singles, with selected chart positions and certifications
Title	Year	Peak chart positions				Album
Title	Year	US Dance	US Elec.	BUL	RUS	Album
Credited as Jessica Sutta
"I Wanna Be Bad"	2010	—	—	—	—	Non-album single
"Show Me"	2011	1	—	8	213	Teen Spirit
"Again" (featuring Kemal Golden)	2013	14	39	—	—	Non-album single
"Lights Out"	2013	3	—	—	—	Non-album single
"Candy"	2014	—	—	—	—	Non-album single
"Bottle Bitch"	2015	6	—	—	—	Non-album single
"Let It Be Love" (featuring Rico Love)	2015	6	—	—	—	Non-album single
"Don't Take Much"	2026	—	—	—	—	Non-album single
"That's the Way Love Goes"	2026	—	—	—	—	Non-album single
Credited as J Sutta
"Feline Resurrection"	2015	—	—	—	—	Non-album single
"Damn! (I Wish I Was Your Lover)"	2015	—	—	—	—	Non-album single
"Forever"	2016	—	—	—	—	I Say Yes
"Get Lost"	2016	—	—	—	—	Non-album single
"Distortion"	2016	1	—	—	—	I Say Yes
"Feel Like Making Love"	2017	—	—	—	—	I Say Yes
"—" denotes releases that did not chart or were not released in that territory.

=== As featured artist ===
List of singles as featured artist, with selected chart positions
Title	Year	Peak chart positions									Album
Title	Year	US Dance	US Under	AUT	BUL	FIN	GER	SCO	UK	UK Dance	Album
"Make It Last" (Dave Audé featuring Jessica Sutta)	2007	1	—	—	—	—	—	—	—	—	Make It Last
"White Lies" (Paul van Dyk featuring Jessica Sutta)	2007	3	15	73	3	14	38	37	80	11	In Between
"Where Ever U Are" (Cedric Gervais featuring Jessica Sutta)	2011	—	—	—	—	—	—	—	—	—	Miamication
"Out with a Bang" (Xenia Ghali featuring Jessica Sutta)	2013	—	—	—	—	—	—	—	—	—	Non-album singles
"For Myself" (S-X featuring Jessica Sutta)	2014	—	—	—	—	—	—	—	—	—	Non-album singles
"I'm Gonna Get You" (Dave Audé featuring Jessica Sutta)	2015	1	—	—	—	—	—	—	—	—	Non-album singles
"Power" (Dennis Blaze featuring Jessica Sutta)	2017	—	—	—	—	—	—	—	—	—	Non-album singles
"Our Song Comes On" (Marc Stout featuring Jessica Sutta)	2019	8	—	—	—	—	—	—	—	—	Non-album singles
"—" denotes releases that did not chart or were not released in that territory.

=== Promotional singles ===
List of promotional singles
Title	Year	Album
"In a Box" (featuring BB)	2012	Non-album single
"I Say Yes" (featuring Rico Love)	2017	I Say Yes

== Other appearances ==
Title	Year	Other artists	Album
"If I Was a Man"	2008	—N/a	Doll Domination
"Pin Up Girl"	2011	Erick Morillo	Erick Morillo Project
"This is Ya Life"	2014	Duane Harden	#NB4U

== Music videos ==
List of music videos, showing year released and directors
Year	Title	Directors
2007	"White Lies"	Lucy Adams
2010	"I Wanna Be Bad"	Frank E. Flowers
2011	"Pin-Up Girl"	Eugene Riecansky
2011	"Show Me"	SKINNY
2012	"In a Box"	—N/a
2013	"Again"	Ryan Rabih Zeidan
2013	"Lights Out"	Ryan Rabih Zeidan
2013	"Out With a Bang"	—N/a
2014	"Candy"	Eddie Serrano
2015	"Let It Be Love"	Jose Hernandez
2015	"Let It Be Love" (Remix)	Jose Hernandez
2015	"I'm Gonna Get You"	Matty Sims
2015	"Feline Resurrection"	Jose Hernandez
2015	"Damn! (I Wish I Was Your Lover)"	Jose Hernandez
2016	"Forever"	Jose Hernandez
2016	"Bottle B!tch"	Jose Hernandez
2016	"Get Lost"	Jose Hernandez
2016	"Distortion"	Cake Kills
2017	"When a Girl Loves a Boy"	—N/a
2026	"Don't Take Much"	—N/a
