= DJ IDeaL =

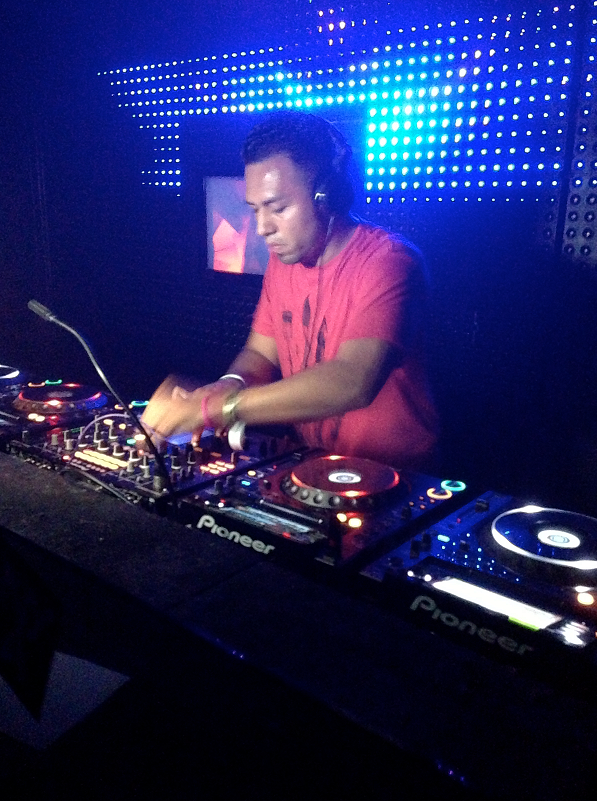

Background information
- Birth name: Tomas Serrano
- Born: April 30, 1982 (age 43); Mexico City, Mexico
- Origin: Mexico
- Genres: Progressive house; Electro house; Breakbeat; House; Tech house
- Occupation(s): Producer, musician, DJ
- Years active: 1997–present
- Labels: Black Hole; Citrusonic Stereophonic; Red Bull; Vandit
- Website: www.djideal.com

Tomas Serrano (born April 30, 1982), known professionally as DJ IDeaL or IDeaL, is a Mexican American producer, musician, and DJ. He has gained notoriety in the EDM community, producing tracks in numerous electronic genres. He has worked extensively with other established EDM artists like J-Break, Tristan D, and Paul Oakenfold. He has also played numerous major EDM festivals, including the Ultra Music Festival, Life in Color, and the San Diego Pride Festival. DJ IDeaL considers San Diego, California his hometown.

== Music career ==
Serrano's interest in dance music was spurred by a family member when he was only 8 years old. He began DJing at 15 for a senior project in high school. From that point, he began performing at house parties and underground events. He also attended UC Santa Cruz where he became active in the rave scene. By the early 2000s, Serrano was working in rave and nightclub scenes at 18+ & 21+ nightclubs in both Tijuana and San Diego. In 2006, he was a promotions manager for Giant while also managing the Belo Nightclub in San Diego.

Jägermeister sponsored DJ IDeaL in the late 2000s, making him their first house music artist. He has also been the resident DJ at numerous nightclubs, including most recently at Avalon Hollywood in California and Guacara Taina in Santo Domingo, Dominican Republic. DJ IDeaL first teamed up with J-Break in 2011 on a remix for Eddie Amador's "Morning After." He went on to produce original mixes with Eddie Amador and J-Break, including "I Need You" in 2013. In 2014, he released an original mix with Tristan D entitled "Miami" which reached #14 in the Beatport Trance charts. Throughout his career, IDeaL has performed alongside notable EDM artists like Paul Oakenfold, Tiësto, and The Crystal Method in locations across the United States, and the Dominican Republic, Greece. He has also performed at the Playboy Mansion numerous times.

== Discography ==
Year	Single/Remix	Peak positions		
Year	Single/Remix	US Dance	Beatport Trance	Beatport Top 100
2012	"Arrow Through My Heart" by Eddie Amador & Kimberly Cole (remix w/ J-Break)	16	–	–
2012	"The Rush" by Warren Nomi (remix w/ J-Break)	4	–	–
2013	"The Lucky Ones" by Kerli (remix w/ J-Break)	1	–	–
2013	"Again" by Jessica Sutta feat. Kemal Golden (remix w/ J-Break)	14	–	–
2014	"Miami" (original mix w/ Tristan D)	–	14	–
2014	"The Rising" by Five Knives (remix w/ J-Break)	9	–	–
2014	"Bombs Away" by Gia (remix w/ J-Break)	3	–	–
2014	"Tonight" by Aiden Jude feat. Nafsica (remix w/ J-Break)	4	–	35
