= J-Break =

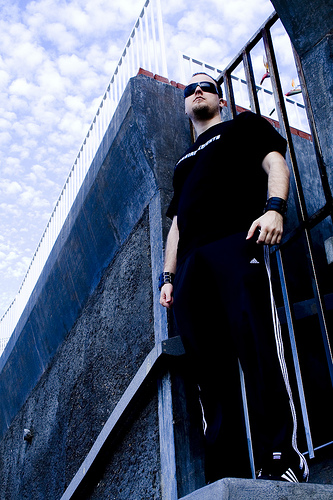
- J-Break, 2008

Background information
- Origin: San Diego, California, U.S.
- Genres: Electro house, progressive house, breakbeat, dubstep
- Years active: 1995–present
- Labels: Docka Records, Citrusonic, Black Hole Recordings, Island Def Jam, RCA

J-Break is an American music producer and DJ.

== Career ==
J-Break was introduced to the electronic music scene in 1995 while attending Orlando nightclubs like the Edge, Ultraviolet (UV), and Firestone. At the age of 19, he got his first residency at the former Mimosa nightclub along with other residents Wutam and Davie-D. Davie-D gave J-Break his first booking and contributed to scratches on his first release "C'Mon & Touch Me", which received rotation on 95.3 FM in Orlando, Florida.

In 1999, J-Break started Millennium Breaks Productions, home to releases such as "Feel The Heat", "Drop It Down" and "This Is The Sound of Underground," which was licensed to DJ Baby Anne's "Mixed Live: Club Ra, Las Vegas" mix compilation. Later that year, J-Break became a resident on 96.9 FM in Orlando and WYKS 105.3 FM in Gainesville, Florida alongside DJs Andy Hughes, DJ Sandy, and Wutam.

In 2002, Wutam and J-Break released their debut mix CD, Biomechanik, the follow-up to Infiniti's "Looking for Something" on Subculture Records. The title song was released on Afterdark Records, with support from DJs such as Merlyn, Baitercell & Schumacher, and Simply Jeff.

After the success of the Cyberian Knights debut "This Is The Sound of Underground," J-Break joined Jackal from Jackal & Hyde and Dynamix II. Together they formed Cyberian Knights Recordings, a collaborative effort to help popularize electro music. Jackal and J-Break began their world tour in support of their new label, performing in cities like Los Angeles and Barcelona, where J-Break recorded his live mix CD "Barcelona, Spain" for Afterdark Records.

In 2004, J-Break joined forces with Agent K from Agent K & Deuce. Together they formed Distorted Recordings, a sub-label of the two artists' sister labels, Cyberian Knights Recordings and Warped Recordz. The first two releases by Agent K & The Klubbheads, received airplay in clubs and radio stations around the world. They were included on mixes such as DJ Mondo's "Tampa Breaks Vol. 4" and Storm & Trevor Rockwell's "Future Sounds of Breaks."

2005 was a big year for J-Break who performed over one hundred gigs while touring with Jackal & Hyde through cities all over North America. The tour included renown festivals like Love Parade in San Francisco & Earthdance in Phoenix. J-Break collaborated with international artists working in different genres. During this period, the producer released tracks like "Dark Circles" with Josef Plante (w/ Autobots UK remix) and "Science Fiction" w/ Infiniti. These releases received support from Deekline & Wizard (UK), Exzakt, Baitercell & Schumacher (New Zealand) and others.

2006 was a year of significant productions for J-Break, including three international releases. He also undertook a European tour with Agent K when they recorded their "Live from London CD". The track "American Werewolf in London" featured the UK nu skool artist Screwface on the remix, which was featured on Annie Nightingale's BBC Radio 1 mix show. This release was followed by "Drop It" with ATF's Lethal Agent, released on the Spanish electro label, Dona-Li. J-Break played his debut performance at Ultra Music Festival during the Winter Music Conference in Miami.

In 2007, J-Break began new studio collaborations with producers of different genres including Deekline & Wizard featuring DJ Assault, MC Messinian of Planet of the Drums, DJ Reid Speed, Oona Dahl, and Josef Plante. After a successful gig in New York, house music became a new love for J-Break. This inspired a new studio album produced with Wutam that would be released in early 2008. The self-titled album featured four singles that charted on Beatport in several genres, including house, electro house and progressive house.

After moving to San Diego, in 2008 international artists such as Tiesto, Hybrid, Miss Nine from Yoshitoshi Records, and Grammy award-winning artist Joachim Garraud supported Wutam & J-Break's new productions. This led to remix offers from world-renowned labels such as Eddie Amador's Mochico Primo Records, Paul Oakenfold's Perfecto Records, David Guetta and Joachim Garraud's Gum Records, and Melleefresh's Play Records.

Later in 2009, J-Break was featured on DJ Reid Speed's "Under The Influence" mix CD on Moist Music. Wutam & J-Break signed with dPulse Distribution/Sony BMG/Universal Music Group as "Sidetrax" along with David "Scratch D" Noller from Dynamix II, a gold certified electro artist from Miami to remix Billie Ray Martin's "Your Loving Arms".

By 2010, J-Break teamed up with Jägermeister house artist, DJ IDeaL to make a remix of BT's classic hit, "Remember". He was also featured on Paul Oakenfold's Perfecto & BT's XM/Sirius radio shows. International artists such as The Crystal Method, Manuel De La Mare, and Donald Glaude quickly began supporting the team's original productions.

In 2011, IDeaL and J-Break headlined several shows during the Winter Music Conference and Miami Music Week. This culminated with their live set before over 150,000 people at the sold-out Ultra Music Festival in downtown Miami. The duo's set was featured on Ultra Music Festival's UMF Radio Show on XM/Sirius Radio the following week. Their remix of Eddie Amador and Kimberly Cole "Arrow Through My Heart" hit the Billboard Charts for over 10 weeks.

After performing at Ultra Music Festival '12 and the Madonna album release party during Miami Music Week, the duo spent the rest of the year working in the studio on remixes. They worked with artists such as Adam Lambert, Mickey Avalon, Warren Nomi and Kerli's The Lucky Ones, which went #1 on the Billboard Dance Club chart.

Within weeks of 2013, IDeaL and J-Break collaborated with Grammy-nominated house music producer Eddie Amador to produce "I Need You." The track featured Tom Napack of Vanity Police and formerly of Dangerous Muse. "I Need You" was released by Tiesto's label, Black Hole Recordings. In April, the duo remixed former Pussycat Dolls singer, Jessica Sutta on her song "Again" featuring Kemal Golden, it peaked at #14 on the Billboard Dance Club Songs chart.

In 2014, IDeaL and J-Break remixed "The Rising" by Five Knives on Red Bull Records, which peaked at #9 on the Billboard Dance Club Songs chart. The duo also had success with remixes for "Bombs Away" by Gia (#3 on Billboard Hot Dance Club Songs chart), "Tonight" by Aiden Jude (#4 on Billboard Hot Dance Club Songs chart and #35 on Beatport Top 100 chart), as well as "Werq" & "Around the World" (#23 on Billboard Dance Club Songs chart) by Carmen Electra.

In March 2015, IDeaL and J-Break remixed Amador and Ultra Nate's song "Take Care Of My Heart," which debuted at #1 on the Billboard Breakout chart and #24 on the Billboard Dance Club Songs chart. The duo also remixed Philip George's "Wish You Were Mine," which peaked at #2 on the UK Singles Chart, #1 on the UK Dance chart and #7 on the Billboard Dance Club Songs chart. "Wish You Were Mine" was certified Multi-Platinum in the UK by BPI with over 600,000 units sold. Other remixes include Motown's Rich White Ladies' "Wimbledon" and "No Bad Vibes" as well as Paris Hilton's "High Off My Love", which peaked at #3 on the Billboard Dance Club Songs and #35 on Hot Dance/Electronic Songs charts.

2016 brought new remixes for IDeaL & J-Break, including Lady Gaga's "Til It Happens To You", which was nominated for the 2016 Academy Award for Best Original Song. "Til It Happens" also peaked at #1 on the Billboard Dance Club Songs, #27 on the Hot Digital Songs, and #19 on the Adult Contemporary charts. They also remixed 80s New Wave group, Pet Shop Boys single "The Pop Kids", which also went #1 on the Billboard Dance Club Songs

In April 2017, IDeaL & J-Break's remix of Lisa Cole "Lost Love" peaked at #19 on the Billboard Dance Club Songs. Later in 2017, their remix of Taryn Manning "Gltchlfe" peaked at #1 on the Billboard Dance Club Songs chart. The duo also remixed the classic Smash Mouth "Walkin On The Sun" in celebration of the 20th anniversary of the single. IDeaL & J-Break's debut remix on their Docka Records label imprint, Eko Zu "Let Me Fall" was released in 2018. The duo later remixed U2 "Love Is Bigger Than Anything in Its Way", which topped the Billboard Dance Club Songs chart at #1.

J-Break began to return to his breakbeat roots in 2021 with an original electro breakbeat track with Hip Hop artist T-Pain "Down For Some Freakin'" which peaked at #9 on the Beatport Breaks charts. In 2022, J-Break was signed to breakbeat/trap imprint Ravesta Records. His first single "The Light" peaked at #21 on the Beatport Breaks charts. His follow-up single "Turn Up" peaked at #26 on the Beatport Breaks charts.

His first Trap release "Black Panther" peaked at #47 on the Beatport Trap charts in 2023. J-Break teamed up with breakbeat artist, OnDaMike, for their single "The Rhythm", which peaked at #7 on the Beatport Breaks charts. Their follow-up "Feel It" peaked at #16 on the Beatport Breaks charts. J-Break then remixed Docka featuring hip hop artist, Rick Ross for their track "Burnin' on Docka Records.

In just the first half of 2024, 12 of J-Break's tracks and remixes charted in 3 genres across the Beatport track charts, including the hit #1 chart topping release, "All This Bass", with Code Rising released on ElectroBreakz. The track was featured as Beatport's "Best New Electro". and Beatport's Best Tracks of 2024. The J-Break remix of Technobabble's "Detroit To Berlin" was featured on Beatport's Best New Electro of June 2024, as well as the Beatport Electro Shortlist. J-Break closed out the year appearing on Beatport's Chart Toppers 2024 at #13 for the second consecutive year.

J-Break started 2025 topped the charts again with a #1 electro track on Beatport, "Jinx", featuring Romanian singer, BirdRBC. He followed this up with another electro track, "ICU", with Proto, one half of the duo Code Rising. The track hit the Beatport electro charts at #23. J-Break followed this up with more collaborations with Code Rising, "Take Me Down" & Can't Stop (#11 & #20 on the Beatport Electro charts), Brothers Bud "Count On You" (#40 on the Beatport Breaks chart), and "Hooked" with James Wolfe (#2 on the Beatport Electro charts). His cover of Zedd "Clarity" hit #10 on the Beatport Breaks charts and featured on the Beatport Best New Breaks of June 2025, as well as Beatport Staff picks, and was supported by international breaks artists, Brothers of Funk, Greenflamez, Mizzo and James Wolfe. The second half of the year brought several more charts and features including Afghan Headspin & J-Break "Fly So High" picked for Beatport's Summer Sounds 2025 chart and the Beatport Best New Breaks of June 2025. J-Break hit the top 10 twice in a row with his remixes of D-Region & Code "Above The Beyond", as well as his collaboration with Slug (FL) "Last Trip".

== Midnight Stereo ==
In 2023, J-Break started an electronic rock band side project, Midnight Stereo. The first single, "Visions", was released in July of 2024 and quickly rose to the top of the Beatport Disco/Nu Disco and Dance/Electro Pop charts (Shawn Jackson remix), peaking at #8 in both genres. "Visions" was also featured in a Magnetic Magazine article, praising the band as "innovative and nostalgic". Their follow-up "Lost In Time" also received success on the Beatport charts in 6 genres, including an electro remix by J-Break. The band started their world tour with a week of gigs booked for the Amsterdam Dance Event conference in October 2024 opening for legendary house artists, Gene Farris and Crusy from Toolroom Records.

== Discography ==
Year	Single/Remix	Peak positions				
Year	Single/Remix	US Dance	Beatport Trap/Wave	Beatport Electro	Beatport Breaks	Beatport Top 100
2012	"Arrow Through My Heart" by Eddie Amador & Kimberly Cole (remix w/ IDeaL)	16	–	–	–	–
2012	"The Rush" by Warren Nomi (remix w/ IDeaL)	4	–	–	–	–
2013	"The Lucky Ones" by Kerli (remix w/ IDeaL)	1	–	–	–	–
2013	"Again" by Jessica Sutta feat. Kemal Golden (remix w/ IDeaL)	14	–	–	–	–
2014	"The Rising" by Five Knives (remix w/ IDeaL)	9	–	–	–	–
2014	"Bombs Away" by Gia (remix w/ IDeaL)	3	–	–	–	–
2014	"Tonight" by Aiden Jude feat. Nafsica (remix w/ IDeaL)	4	–	–	–	35
2015	"Take Care of My Heart" by Ultra Naté & Eddie Amador (remix w/ IDeaL)	21	–	–	–	–
2015	"Wish You Were Mine" by Philip George (remix w/ IDeaL)	7	–	–	–	–
2015	"High Off My Love" by Paris Hilton (remix w/ IDeaL)	3	–	–	–	–
2016	"Til It Happens To You" by Lady Gaga (remix w/ IDeaL)	1	–	–	–	–
2016	"The Pop Kids" by Pet Shop Boys (remix w/ IDeaL)	1	–	–	–	–
2017	"Lost Love" by Lisa Cole (remix w/ IDeaL)	19	–	–	–	–
2017	"Gltchlfe" by Taryn Manning (remix w/ IDeaL)	1	–	–	–	–
2018	"Love Is Bigger Than Anything in Its Way" by U2 (remix w/ IDeaL)	1	–	–	–	–
2021	"Down For Some Freakin'" by J-Break feat. T-Pain	–	–	–	9	–
2022	"The Light" by J-Break	–	–	–	21	–
2022	"Turn Up" by J-Break	–	–	–	26	–
2023	"The Rhythm" by OnDaMike & J-Break	–	–	–	7	–
2023	"Feel It" by OnDaMike & J-Break	–	–	–	16	–
2023	"Black Panther" by J-Break	–	47	–	–	–
2024	"Dark Expanse" by Inner Realms & J-Break	–	–	–	23	–
2024	"Let's Go" by J-Break	–	94	–	–	–
2024	"Got It Bad" by Slug (FL) & J-Break	–	–	–	12	–
2024	"Save Me" by J-Break	–	51	–	–	–
2024	"Paradise" by J-Break	–	–	–	60	–
2024	"Bust This Out" by Alexandria's Genesis (J-Break remix)	–	–	–	53	–
2024	"Futurebound" by Inner Realms & J-Break	–	–	–	75	–
2024	"Don't Let Me Down" by J-Break	–	–	–	25	–
2024	"Down" by Menges & J-Break	–	–	–	28	–
2024	"This Is Miami" by IDeaL & J-Break (J-Break remix)	–	–	35	–	–
2024	"This Melody" by Masaharu (J-Break remix)	–	–	–	38	–
2024	"All This Bass" by Code Rising & J-Break	–	–	1	–	–
2024	"Detroit To Berlin" by Technobabble (J-Break remix)	–	–	14	–	–
2024	"Loco" by Alexandria's Genesis (J-Break remix)	–	–	29	–	–
2024	"Lost In Time" by Midnight Stereo (J-Break remix)	–	–	37	–	–
2024	"Fire" by J-Break	–	–	–	51	–
2025	"Jinx" by J-Break & BirdRBC	–	–	1	–	–
2025	"ICU" by Proto & J-Break	–	–	23	–	–
2025	"Take Me Down" by Code Rising & J-Break	–	–	11	–	–
2025	"Count On You" by Brothers Bud & J-Break	–	–	–	41	–
2025	"Can't Stop" by Code Rising & J-Break	–	–	20	–	–
2025	"Hooked" by James Wolfe & J-Break	–	–	2	–	–
2025	"Clarity" by J-Break	–	–	–	10	–
2025	"Old Skool" by Brothers Bud & J-Break	–	–	–	46	–
2025	"Bad Man" by Brothers Bud & J-Break	–	–	–	52	–
2025	"Fly So High" by Afghan Headspin & J-Break	–	–	–	53	–
2025	"AI" by J-Break	–	–	–	61	–
2025	"Can You Feel It" by Brothers Bud & J-Break	–	–	–	29	–
2025	"Last Trip" by J-Break & Slug (FL)	–	–	–	59	–
2025	"Last Trip" by J-Break & Slug (FL) (J-Break remix)	–	–	8	–	–
2025	"Darkness" by Afghan Headspin & J-Break	–	–	–	18	–
2025	"Above The Beyond" by D-Region & Code (J-Break remix)	–	–	5	–	–
2025	"Original Raver" by Slyde feat. Lady Posh (Brothers Bud & J-Break remix)	–	–	–	46	–
2025	"Knives" by WoTeR & J-Break	–	–	–	55	–
2025	"Mind Control" by J-Break feat. Flo Rida	–	–	–	11	–
2025	"Mind Control" by J-Break feat. Flo Rida (Afghan Headspin remix)	–	–	6	–	–
2025	"Kick It" by Afghan Headspin & J-Break	–	–	–	41	–
2025	"The Herbgrinder" by Brothers Bud (Brothers Bud & J-Break remix)	–	–	–	20	–
2025	"Shake That Ass" by J-Break & UhnKnWn Music	–	–	–	6	–
2025	"Bassline Vandal" by Afghan Headspin & J-Break	–	–	–	56	–
2025	"ILL Behavior" by Afghan Headspin & J-Break	–	–	–	13	–
2025	"The Club" by J-Break	–	–	7	–	–
2025	"W Axis" by Alex Physalis (J-Break remix)	–	–	–	56	–
2025	"Rollin" by J-Break	–	–	–	57	–
