= Show Me (Jessica Sutta song) =

Single by Jessica Sutta

from the album Teen Spirit
- Released: August 23, 2011
- Genre: Electropop
- Length: 3:44
- Label: Hollywood
- Songwriters: Busbee, Alex Geringas, Paddy Dalton
- Producer: Busbee

Jessica Sutta singles chronology
| "Where Ever U Are" (2011) | "Show Me" (2011) | "Again" (2013) |

Music video
- "Show Me" on YouTube

"Show Me" is the debut solo single by American recording artist Jessica Sutta. The song was featured in the movie Teen Spirit. It was written by Alex Geringas, Paddy Dalton and its producer songwriter Busbee, which lyrically talks about how actions talk louder than words. Musically, the song is a club-inspired song. "Show Me" premiered on Idolator on August 3, 2011, and was released on August 23, 2011, via Hollywood Records.

"Show Me" is composed as an uptempo dance-pop and electropop song with a synthpop beat. The song received mostly positive reviews, with music critics complimenting its club anthem-like nature and the synth pop associated with it. The song peaked at number one on the Hot Dance Club Songs in the United States, becoming Sutta's first solo number-one single and first Pussycat Doll to ever top the Billboard Club chart as a solo artist. "Show Me" is Jessica's second time at the top following her 2007 collaboration with Dave Audé, "Make It Last" while her Paul Van Dyk feature "White Lies" peaked at No. 3 in the same year.

A music video was shot for the single, featuring Sutta in an underground club, dancing to the track. The video received positive reviews, with some finding similarities to Janet Jackson's "All Nite (Don't Stop)" and Britney Spears' "Till the World Ends". A remix EP was released on iTunes.

== Background and release ==
Written by Busbee, Alex Geringas and Paddy Dalton, and produced by Busbee (who has also penned tracks for Timbaland and Katy Perry's "If We Ever Meet Again" and Lady Antebellum), "Show Me" explodes with shuffle-fueled energy, reaffirming Jessica as the soulful vocalist. "

"I've had a love of dance music for as long as I can remember. When you're on the floor, you feel dance music in your feet, in your heart. It does put you in a trance in some ways, and I hope my music will do that", she says of the process.

"We got a single a couple of months ago, demo style, and it was just so awesome that i said "Can I please record this tomorrow?" So, I went into the studio and recorded it". Sutta stated that the song talks about how action speaks louder than words. "I feel like that applies to a lot of people in relationships", she said. The song was mixed by Grammy-nominated Veronica Ferraro. In addition, it was remixed by top dance music producers Dave Audé, Alex Gaudino/Jason Rooney, and Ralphi Rosario. "Show Me" is a club-inspired song, which includes strong synthpop and dance-pop genres, as it was clear Sutta really enjoys dance music.

"Show Me" premiered on Idolator on August 3, 2011. The song appeared as a bonus track on 'Now That's What I Call Music! Vol. 39' and was featured in the ABC Family original movie "Teen Spirit". It was released digitally on August 23. Sutta performed the song at House of Blues on August 9, 2011. The song was released in Australia and New Zealand on August 26, 2011, while its due to release in the Netherlands in September or October 2011.

== Critical reception ==
The song received positive reviews from critics. DisneyInfo.net described the song as "an explosive shuffle-inspired dance track sure to thrill longtime fans of Jessica and the Pussycat Dolls". "Idolator's Robbie Daw began its review by writing that Jessica was always his most favorite Pussycat Dolls. He complimented the song for its energy and described it as "club-ready single". MTV Buzzworthy described the song as "a delicious new dance floor anthem". "Sutta's brand new synth-pop explosion is all smoke machines and strobe lights, as the singer takes her man to task: "Love is not a gimme, gimme/If you really with me, you gotta show me, show me", the former Doll cautions during the chorus. It's a total smash! Even if she's no longer a part of all things PCD, Sutta's still snatching wigs and taking over the dance floor as a Club Queen in her own right." Jeff Benjamin of Billboard described the song as "a high-energy dance track, with a "show me love" hook that is begging to be shouted at clubs."

Mike Hess of Celebuzz praised the song for its "infectious new tune", "the club-worthy beat" and the "catchy hook". AOL Music wrote that the song is a "sleek, sexy club track sure to get bodies moving and build anticipation for her forthcoming full-length". MuuMuse described the song as a "throbbin’ club anthem full of pulsating synthesizers and slamming beats". Instinct Magazine wrote: "We tend to adore dance divas whose first hit songs have titles with "Show Me" (Robyn's "Show Me Love" in 1997 and the very different Robin S.'s "Show Me Love" in 1993), so we're hearting what Jessica Sutta is showing us in the new millennium." TheShowt.com wrote that "Show Me" "is destined to have dance floors across Americas gyrating like epileptics under a strobe light", and noted that the song has similar sound to Pussycat Dolls' music. Matt Sigl finished its review by stating that "Show Me" is the kind of instantly inviting and ripely sexual hit that could make Jessica a break-out star in her own right.

== Music video ==
=== Background ===
The music video premiered on August 6, 2011, on ABC Family, and was released on YouTube on Jessica's official VEVO channel on August 11, 2011, at a total length of three minutes and fifty-four seconds. It was directed by SKINNY.

=== Synopsis ===
The video starts out with a city and a siren of a cop. It then goes underground and the song starts to play. Sutta is seen walking with a smile, while the other people are dancing around her. As she walks to the dance floor, a guy catches her eye and she smiles flirtatiously at him before she walks away and the guy proceeds to follow after her. During the video, Jessica and her crew crank the floor-shaking energy up so high that the power goes out. This doesn't stop the party, however, as everyone seems to have brought their flashlights along and begin to dance seductively while some of the dancers engage in public displays of affections with their love interests. This is followed by the flashlight-wielding guy she conveniently bumps into earlier looking for her at the party, searching various rooms filled with some couples making out while a girl applying her makeup writes the song's title on the bathroom mirror in lipstick. Before the clip is over, the power comes back on and everyone on the dance floor dances more energetically while the flashlight-wielding guy finally reunites with his love interest Sutta and the two of them proceed to bump and grind in dance-pop bliss. The video then ends while Jessica smiles to the camera and then fades away.

== Track listing ==
Digital download
| No. | Title | Length |
|---|---|---|
| 1. | "Show Me" | 3:44 |

Remixes EP
| No. | Title | Length |
|---|---|---|
| 1. | "Show Me" (Dave Audé Club Mix) | 7:09 |
| 2. | "Show Me" (Alex Gaudino and Jason Rooney Club Mix) | 6:34 |
| 3. | "Show Me" (Ralphi Rosario Club Mix) | 8:09 |

== Chart performance ==
"Show Me" debuted as the No. 1 Breakout Song on the Billboard dance chart entering the Hot Dance Club Songs chart at number 39 on the issue dated 23 August 2011. The following week, on August 31, 2011, "Show Me" climbed to number twenty-nine. After rising on the chart for two months, it took the number one spot in its eleventh week.

=== Charts ===
| Chart (2011) | Peak position |
|---|---|
| U.S. Billboard Hot Dance Club Songs | 1 |

=== Year-end charts ===
| Chart (2011) | Position |
|---|---|
| US Hot Dance Club Songs (Billboard) | 32 |

== Release history ==
| Country | Date | Format | Label |
|---|---|---|---|
| United States | August 9, 2011 | Digital download | Hollywood Records |
| United States | August 23, 2011 | CD single, digital download, airplay | Hollywood Records |
| Worldwide | August 23, 2011 | Digital download, airplay | Hollywood Records |
| Australia | August 26, 2011 | Digital download | Hollywood Records |
| New Zealand | August 26, 2011 | Digital download | Hollywood Records |
| The Netherlands | September/October 2011 | Digital download, airplay | Hollywood Records |
| United States | October 2011 | Mainstream radio | Hollywood Records |

== See also ==
- List of number-one dance singles of 2011 (U.S.)
