= Rise (Eddie Amador song) =

2000 single by Eddie Amador

Single by Eddie Amador
- Released: 1 January 2000
- Recorded: 1999
- Genre: House

Rise is a single released by Eddie Amador. It was most successful in the United Kingdom where it peaked at #19 in the singles charts and #1 in the Dance Charts during January 2000.

== Charts ==
Chart (2000)	Peak position
United Kingdom (The Official Charts Company)	19
UK Dance (OCC)	1
