= Candace Kroslak =

American actress

- Born: Candace Kaye Kroslak; July 22, 1978 (age 48); Chicago, Illinois, U.S.
- Occupation: Actress

Candace Kaye Kroslak van Dell (born July 22, 1978) is an American actress known for her role as Lindy Maddock in the Swedish American soap opera Ocean Ave.

== Early life ==
Kroslak was born in Chicago, Cook County, Illinois, of Slovak descent.

== Career ==
Before Ocean Ave., Kroslak appeared in the movies Demonicus, Planet of the Apes and Soul Survivors. In the last few years, she has had guest roles on television series such as CSI: Miami, What About Brian, Shark, Las Vegas, How I Met Your Mother and Scrubs.

She played Brandy in the 2006 direct to video movie American Pie Presents: The Naked Mile. In 2011 she appeared on Days of Our Lives for 12 episodes and appeared in Take Me Home Tonight alongside Topher Grace, Chris Pratt, Anna Faris and Teresa Palmer.

She also appeared on the cover of the April 2011 and 2013 issue covers of Runner's World magazine.

Candace was a model at Wilhelmina Modeling Agency worldwide but retired in 2012 after going back to school to earn her Masters in Spiritual Psychology. She creates and teaches many online courses, does worldwide coaching, YouTube, podcast and hosts retreats. She is an author and also writes for many blogs and publications.

After getting married in 2013 she changed her name to Candace van Dell. She has since divorced in 2021 but keeps the name for professional reasons.

== Personal life ==
In 2013 Candace got married and changed her last name to van Dell. She divorced in 2021 but kept her married name for her Spiritual Psychology profession and is now known as Candace van Dell.

== Filmography ==
=== Film ===
Year	Title	Role	Notes
2000	Demonicus	Teresa	
2001	Planet of the Apes	Friend at Leo's Party	
2001	Soul Survivors	Cool Blonde	
2006	American Pie Presents: The Naked Mile	Brandy	
2011	Take Me Home Tonight	Ally	

=== Television ===
Year	Title	Role	Notes
2000	City Guys	Cute Girl	Episode: "Who Da Man?"
2002–2003	Ocean Ave.	Lindy Maddock / Lindy Maddux	Recurring role; 117 episodes
2006	CSI: Miami	Nicole	Episode: "Skeletons"
2006	What About Brian	Bike Messenger	Episode: "Two in Twenty-Four"
2006	Shark	Hot Date	Episode: "Russo"
2006	How I Met Your Mother	Girl #1	Episode: "Slap Bet"
2006	Las Vegas	Hot Chick #1	Episode: "White Christmas"
2006	Let Go	Julie	Television film
2007	Rules of Engagement	Beth	2 episodes
2007	Scrubs	Kristin	Episode: "My No Good Reason"
2008	Knight Rider	Aquarius	Episode: "Knight of the Zodiac"
2011	Days of Our Lives	Mandy Pierce	7 episodes
2011	Man Up!	Blonde	Episode: "Wingmen"
