= Ocean Ave. =

- Genre: Drama
- Created by: Joanna Coons
- Written by: Joanna Coons
- Directed by: Constance Hoy, Jason Sklaver, Jonathan Wyche, Adele Cecchi
- Creative director: Bill O'Dowd
- Starring: Steve DuMouchel; Marc Menard; Candace Kroslak; Sean Sullivan; Andrea Abenoza
- Theme music composer: Andreas Helmle; Alex Menck; Amedeo Tortora
- Composer: Andreas Helmle
- Countries of origin: Sweden; United States
- Original languages: English; Swedish
- No. of seasons: 1
- No. of episodes: 130

Production
- Running time: 60 minutes
- Production companies: Dolphin Entertainment; Kajak

Original release
- Network: TV4
- Release: August 26, 2002 – April 1, 2003

Ocean Ave. is a Swedish-American low budget daytime soap opera, produced by the Swedish production company, Kajak, and filmed by the Florida-based production company Dolphin Entertainment. Set and filmed in Miami, Florida, the series premiered on TV4 in Sweden in 2002.

The main cast included only five Swedish actors, four other Swedish actors were seen in minor roles in hopes the series would be distributed beyond Sweden. 130 hour-long episodes were filmed, then ultimately split in half into 260 half-hours.

The series shifted from the early prime time slot to middays after experiencing low ratings, and despite being an American co-production, never aired outside Sweden.

== Plot ==
Soap opera actor Timothy Adams plays cop Thomas "Thom" O'Keefe, who is working on the case of a prostitute-murdering serial killer. Thom's father, the police commissioner, Jamie O'Keefe (Marc Macaulay), has been involved in other illegal activities for years. When Thom finds out about his father’s criminal life, he flips out and tries to kill Roberto Rendon, but everything goes wrong and Thom is shot by Manny Ortega. At the hospital, Thom forgives his mother who left him when he was a child, and he begs Sage to promise that she will leave Macy. Thom then dies. Sage follows through with her promise. She divorces Macy, but helps him to escape from the Russians, Vladimir (Angelo Fierro) and Vega, who are after him for not paying them the money he owes. In the last episode, Sage marries Thom, who mysteriously comes back to life.

It is found later that the psychopath, Manny Ortega, has killed countless people. One of them, Stefan Eriksson, was shot to death in front of his dear son Alex, who blacked out and can not remember the murderer because of amnesia. Alex finally regains his memory and recognizes Manny as his father's killer. Manny then confesses in front of Alex and Elena and tells them he is also behind the explosion at Dev Tech, in Sweden. It is there that Nora, the mother of Chrissy and Alex, died. Manny's plan was to kill Stefan, but he survived until he shot him. Manny also tells Alex and Elena that he was the man who raped Elena's mother, Alicia, and that he then strangled her and planted her car in the water so it looked like she drowned in a car accident. Manny probably strangled Hadley Marx as well, but he never confesses to it. Manny is finally shot to death by his own son, Jimmy Ray, who was sent by Roberto.

The journalist, Crystal Tate (Victoria Jackson), starts her own investigation and finds out many dark secrets about the Devon, O'Keefe, Hamilton, and Rendon families. The secrets date back to 1977 and have to do with the death of bordello girl Jazz De Guise (Heidi Mark). Everybody thinks that Jazz died of a drug overdose but Crystal convinces the police to reopen the Jazz case and the question "Who killed Jazz?" makes the Devons and O'Keefes very nervous.

Later in the series, the Swedish model and actress, Victoria Silvstedt, appears in a few episodes in hopes to boost the ratings. She played a sexy detective sent to Miami to help the police with the serial killer case, but she soon falls victim to the killer herself.

== Cast ==
- Timothy Adams as Thomas "Thom" O'Keefe
- Kristy Eisenberg as Sage Devon
- Victoria Jackson as Crystal Tate
- Marc Macaulay as Jamie O'Keefe
- Lyn Foley as Lorraine O'Keefe / Teri Martin
- Tony Templeton as Macy Devon
- Steve DuMouchel as Martin Devon
- Leigh Lombardi as Anne Devon
- Jean Carol as Catherine Devon
- Marc Menard as Lucas Devon
- Angelo Fierro as Vladimir
- Megan Fox as Ione Starr
- Jessica Sutta as Jody Starr
- Rebecca Ferguson as Chrissy Eriksson
- Candace Kroslak as Lindy
- Gwendolyn Osborne as Jade
- Justin Gorence as Dr. Will O'Keefe
- Edward Finlay as Dylan O'Keefe
- Francisco Paz as Manny Ortega
- Carlos Iglesias as Jimmy Ray Ortega
- Antoni Corone as Roberto Rendon
- Denise DeQuevedo as Elena Rendon
- Jan Waldekranz as Stefan Eriksson
- Jacqueline Ramel as Nora Eriksson
- Marcus Larsson as Alex Eriksson
- Pa Neumüller as Charlotta Eriksson
- Natalie Khoury as Gaby Hamilton
- Matthew McKerrow as Ian Blake
- Petrus Antonius as Tony
- Nicole Rawlins as Kayla
- Robert Fitzsimmons as Mike
- Michael Sarysz as Raider
- Michael Anderson as Marco
- Ken Clement as Harry Sowalski
- Brian Baer as Davey Lapin

=== Guest roles ===
- Nick Ondarza as Ramon Vega
- Kalex as Armand Vega
- Bart Baldwin as Bobby Devon
- Sean Sullivan as Josh Mandell
- Sarah-Elizabeth Walk as Model Mandy
- Martin Forsström as Nils Thurmond
- Wayne Farnes as P.I. Paterson
- Thatcher Stevens as Vincent
- Miriam Salazar as Julianna Ortega
- Peter Haig as Trebly
- Andrea Abenoza as Hadley Marx
- Susanne Krietman Taylor as Dr. Martha Kurtz
- Eric Anderson as Torrance Jones
- Angel Schmiedt as Arlette Kelly-Jones
- Kimona Ryan as Jewel Starr
- Arielle Quatro as Tasha James
- Will McClain as Jordan Matthews
- Sean Dennison as Mr. Steve Ryan
- Linda L. Miller as Lisa Maddux
- Billy Kelly as Matt Baxter
- Francois Boulaire as Louis
- Justine Eyre as Karen
- Brooke Leslie Reid as Regina
- Raul Roman as Coach Perez
- Mario Ingoglia as Janitor
- Michele Lepe as Denise
- Todd Nasca as Jake
- Irene B. Colletti as Joan
- Lee Perkins as Detective Sanders
- Linda Batista as Daniella
- Chanin Owens as Ally/Misty
- Roxie Stice as Louise
- Dave Corey as Dr. Jaspers
- Chris Charles Herbert as Michael Layton
- Krizia Bajos as Noelle
- Magda Hernandez as Alicia Rendon
- Heidi Mark as Jazz De Guise
- Marjorie Manushaw as Kayla's Grandmother
- Tina Harbom as Eva Olin
- Victoria Silvstedt as Detective Johanna Marsden
- Erin Plewes as Jessica
- Monika Kramlik as Nadine Royal
- Sally Boni as Lauren Ramsey
- Vivian Ruiz as Margaret
