= Teen Spirit (2011 film) =

2011 television film by Gil Junger

- Written by: Kathryn McCullough; David Kendall; Bob Young
- Directed by: Gil Junger
- Starring: Cassie Scerbo; Lindsey Shaw; Katie Sarife; Chris Zylka; Tim Gunn
- Country of origin: United States
- Original language: English

Production
- Producers: Robert F. Phillips; Steven Gary Banks; James Middletown
- Cinematography: Dave Perkal
- Editor: Don Brochu
- Running time: 82 minutes

Original release
- Network: ABC Family
- Release: August 7, 2011

Teen Spirit is an American teen comedy film, directed by Gil Junger and starring Cassie Scerbo and Lindsey Shaw. In United States, Teen Spirit was premiered on ABC Family on August 7, 2011, but in South America the film had a theatrical release.

== Plot ==
Amber Pollock, a mean, snobbish, shallow, popular high school senior, dies after being named Prom Queen; she was picking up a crown that was electrified, after an accident with her boyfriend's car. While in Limbo, an angel tasks her with returning to her high school as a ghost in order to transform the school's least popular student, Lisa Sommers, into the next Prom Queen at the makeup prom. If she succeeds, she will be sent to Heaven, and if not, she will be on the next shuttle bus to Hell.

At a memorial announcement at school, Amber realizes her friends do not really care about her, and Lisa is the only one who can see her. Initially, Lisa does not want to go to the prom, but after Amber is able to get her the attention of Lisa's crush Nick Ramsey, Lisa agrees to skip school to go shopping for fashionable clothes and a makeover, during which she charms a "Zac Efron boy" named Aidan at the store. The next day at school, Lisa starts turning the heads of her classmates, but due to Lisa still being nervous, Amber possesses her body to help show off some attitude and gain confidence. But their plan to run for Prom Queen gets complicated when Amber's former friend Carlita decides to run, and she is also dating Nick.

When Carlita decides to throw a house party, Amber and Lisa decide to mess with Carlita's plan by changing the party's date and sending this change in an email from a school computer to everyone's phone at their high school. With Carlita's party plans ruined, Amber and Lisa plan a party at Lisa's house the same night, since her parents are away at a spa treatment. At the party, Amber gets Lisa up on stage to sing "Typical", which attracts the attention of Nick. Lisa and Nick talk after her performance and the two end up sharing an unexpected kiss, but then Amber possesses Lisa again to stop her from sleeping with Nick.

Amber and Lisa soon find out from Vice-Principal Richardson that Lisa's friend, Raj Kurkuri, who was trying to buy a used calculator online, accidentally forgot to log off on a school computer before Lisa sent the changed party date message, and Raj is held responsible for the damages at Carlita's house. Lisa ends up passing on her friends' plans for finishing a claymation pig film now that she is popular. Meanwhile, Amber's sister Clementine feels her mother is too busy mourning the death of Amber to pay any attention to her. Seeing this for herself, Amber helps guide her mother into paying more attention to Clementine now that she has died.

Lisa's friend Selena learns about Amber's involvement with Lisa's popularity and decides to use black magic to tell Amber to leave Lisa alone, but Amber tells her she needs to right what she did wrong in order to get into Heaven. Selena is understanding but still pleads for Amber to help Lisa return to normal. Amber confronts Lisa and, realizing that she has unintentionally ruined her life by making her popular, jumps into her body to drive her out to Oak Springs on Highway 7 (out in the middle of nowhere) so she would not make it back to town in time for the prom that evening. After stumbling onto Floyd's Gator Jerky Shop, she calls all her friends on a pay phone, but is unsuccessful in getting a ride back into town until she reaches Selena. When Selena (along with Raj and Collin) make it to pick her up, Lisa learns being popular isn't what it is cracked up to be. She also learns Raj was suspended and has to perform community service to fix Carlita's yard. Meanwhile, Amber reports her failure to the angel and takes a ride down to Hell in a flaming prison shuttle bus.

After just making it to prom night, Lisa confesses to her vice principal and the rest of the school that it was her that sent the mass email about the change to Carlita's party, not Raj; she then makes a speech on stage that everyone should break down the barriers between the popular and unpopular by voting Raj as Prom King, which almost all of the students agree upon. After Raj is elected Prom King, Amber is transported off the shuttle bus to Hell to get her wings to enter Heaven, as the least popular student was voted Prom King. She appears to Lisa one last time and the two share a hug with Amber when Amber spots Aidan at the prom. Lisa smiles and Amber promises to watch over Lisa from Heaven before she goes. Aidan looked for Lisa at seven different proms before he found her. Aidan and Lisa smile and talk and soon dance; it looks like a new relationship starts. Carlita (angry that she did not get crowned Prom Queen) tries to stop the music by pulling wires from the stage's control box, but gets herself electrocuted in the process. The angel remarks, "Oh, lucky me. Here we go again."

== Cast ==
- Cassie Scerbo as Amber Pollock, a popular high school queen bee.
- Lindsey Shaw as Lisa Sommers, an unpopular girl who wants to get into Juilliard music school.
- Katie Sarife as Selena, Lisa's best friend.
- Chris Zylka as Nick Ramsey, a popular high school guy.
- Tim Gunn as Supervisor J-3, the angel who is responsible for Amber's assignment.
- Lucius Baston as Vice Principal Richardson.
- Travis Quentin Young as Colin, Lisa's friend.
- Paras Patel as Raj Kukuri, Lisa's friend.
- Gabriela Lopez as Carlita Cache, Amber's friend and new queen bee.
- Carissa Capobianco as Paisley, Amber's friend.
- Katrina Tandy as Dakota, Amber's friend.
- Ben Winchell as Aiden
- Rhoda Griffis as Mrs. Sommers
- Cree Ivey as Clementine Pollock
- Andrea Powell as Gillian Pollock
- Elena Varela as Aunt Marielle

== Production ==
Filming took place in Wilmington, North Carolina.

== Soundtrack ==
Teen Spirit

Soundtrack album by Various artists
- Released: August 7, 2011
- Recorded: 2011
- Genre: Soundtrack
- Length: 28:32
- Label: MarVista Entertainment

Singles from Teen Spirit
- 1. "Typical" Released: August 7, 2011; 2. "Show Me" Released: August 23, 2011

Teen Spirit is a soundtrack album by the film of the same name, released on August 7, 2011, by MarVista Entertainment. "Typical", performed by Lindsey Shaw was released as single on August 7.

=== Track listing ===
No.	Title	Performer(s)	Length
1.	"Tonight Tonight"	Hot Chelle Rae	3:10
2.	"Till The World Ends"	Britney Spears	3:15
3.	"The Fame"	Lady Gaga	3:21
4.	"Show Me"	Jessica Sutta	2:19
5.	"Give Me Everything" (featuring Ne-Yo, Afrojack and Nayer)	Pitbull	3:44
6.	"The Edge of Glory"	Lady Gaga	3:14
7.	"(Drop Dead) Beautiful" (featuring Sabi)	Britney Spears	4:05
8.	"Typical"	Lindsey Shaw	3:38

Other songs non-included in soundtrack

- "Arms" – Christina Perri
- "Just in Love" – Joe Jonas
- "Spirit School" – Anya Marina
- "Watch Me Move" – Fefe Dobson
