= Wutam & J-Break =

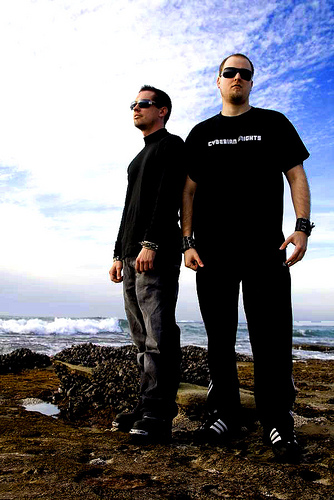
- Wutam & J-Break, 2008

Background information
- Origin: San Diego, California, U.S.
- Genres: Electro house, progressive house, breakbeat
- Years active: 1995–present
- Labels: dPulse, Sony BMG, Universal Music, Blue Beam Recordings
- Website: http://www.Bluebeamrecordings.com

Wutam & J-Break are a live DJ act/production team in electronic music/house music since their residencies in the underground Orlando nightclub scene in 1999. Since then, their original tracks and remixes have gained support from Tiesto, Hybrid (producers), & Joachim Garraud as well as collaborations with Jackal & Hyde, Melleefresh & Josef Plante. In 2008, they had over 10,000 downloads on Beatport.com with top 10 hits such as "Don't You" & "Lady."

Their songs have been heard on Sirius Radio & XM Radio, BBC Radio 1, MTV, praised by Ministry of Sound, & reviewed by URB Magazine & BPM (magazine). They have toured extensively worldwide at events like Love Parade, Earthdance & Ultra Music Festival, as well as prominent nightclubs like The Limelight in New York City.

In 2008, Wutam & J-Break signed with dPulse/Sony BMG /Universal Music Group as Sidetrax with David "Scratch D" Noller from Dynamix II, a gold certified electro artist from Miami, Florida. In 2009, their remix of The Black Eyed Peas "I Gotta Feeling," has received over a million views on YouTube.

== Sources ==
- http://www.your-scene.com/interview_detail.php?id=L6151224064
- http://www.your-scene.com/interview_electro_detail.php?id=L4380760271
- http://538.tiestoworld.nl/
- http://hybridized.org/sets/508
- http://www.nextlevelrecordings.com/JBreak.htm
- http://dancemusic.about.com/od/reviews/fr/JBreakBarc.htm
- http://www.bbc.co.uk/radio1/annienightingale/tracklistingarchive.shtml?20061023
- http://www.sflovefest.org/lpsf_floats_2005.php
- http://www.sflovefest.org/dj_lineup_2006.php
- http://www.djdownload.com/dj-charts/Wutam+26+J-Break+28Digital+Records+-+June+Chart29/1111
- http://www.earthdance.org/2008/flyers.html
- http://www.dpulse-america.com/artists/index.htm
- http://www.dynamixii.com/demo/bio.htm
- http://www.Beatport.com
- https://www.youtube.com/watch?v=5lSQ9Z5wsVE
