= Marc Menard =

Canadian actor

- Born: Quebec City
- Years active: 2002–present

Marc Menard is a Canadian actor. He starred as Michael Krieger on the MyNetworkTV serial Watch Over Me. His previous acting credits include All My Children, Ocean Ave, and the film John Tucker Must Die.

== Filmography ==
Film and television
Year	Title	Role
2002–04	All My Children	Boyd Larraby
2002–03	Ocean Ave.	Lucas Devon
2002	Coffee, Desserts, Lightfare	Guy
2004	House	Soap Doctor
2006–07	Watch Over Me	Michael Krieger
2006	Totally Awesome	Kipp's Boy #2
2006	John Tucker Must Die	Kate's stepfather
2007	CSI: NY	Damien Barnes
2008	The Boy Next Door	Walsh
2008	Yeti: Curse of the Snow Demon	Peyton Elway
2009–10	Lost	Montand
2010	Seduced by Lies	Brad Sterling
2011	Gossip Girl	Father Cavalia
2012–	Crisis Point	Liam McNeil
2012	Viritual Lies	William Chapman
2015	Accidental Obsession	Jack Riley
