= Louis Colavecchio =

American casino counterfeiter (1942-2020)

- Born: January 1, 1942; Rhode Island, U.S.
- Died: July 6, 2020; Cranston, Rhode Island
- Other name: The Coin
- Occupation: Counterfeiter
- Known for: Counterfeiting slot machine coins counterfeiting $100 bills
- Notable work: You Thought It Was More – Adventures of the World’s Greatest Counterfeiter, Louis The Coin (memoir)
- Television: Breaking Vegas (portrayed by Angelo Fierro)
- Status: Convicted
- Convictions: 1998, 2019
- Criminal charges: Counterfeiting
- Penalty: 7 years in prison (1998); 15 months in federal prison (2019)
- Accomplice: Led a gang

Details
- Country: U.S.
- States: Rhode Island, New Jersey, Connecticut, North Carolina

Louis B. Colavecchio (January 1, 1942 – July 6, 2020) was an American casino counterfeiter known as "The Coin". While residing in Rhode Island, Colavecchio defrauded several Atlantic City and Connecticut casinos until his arrest and initial conviction in 1998. He had led a gang which fabricated numerous slot machine coins using hardened steel dies of the originals, and was revealed when casinos began to notice a surplus of coins on their gaming floors. Sentenced to seven years, Colavecchio was released in 2006. He was arrested by the FBI only a few months later after having resumed his activities, and released on a $25,000 surety bond. His counterfeiting equipment was auctioned off on eBay following his arrest, and crimes were the subject of a documentary series Breaking Vegas from The History Channel, where he was portrayed by Angelo Fierro. Due to the initial success of his crime, casinos have slowly phased out tokens, replacing them with paper vouchers. Today slot machines will dispense a paper voucher when a player cashes out. The vouchers are then redeemed for cash at kiosks located next to the cashier.

Colavecchio collaborated with Andy Thibault, a veteran journalist, and Franz Douskey, author of several non-fiction books, including SINATRA & ME: The Very Good Years, to write a memoir, “You Thought It Was More – Adventures of the World’s Greatest Counterfeiter, Louis The Coin.” It was published by IceBox Publishing LLC in 2015.

In August 2019, Colavecchio was sentenced to 15 months in federal prison after pleading guilty to manufacturing counterfeit $100 bills. He died a few weeks after a federal judge granted him compassionate release from the Federal Medical Center in Butner, N.C., a prison for inmates with special health needs.
