= Angelo Fierro =

American film and television actor

Angelo Fierro is an American film and television actor.

Fierro, an Italian-American of Sicilian ancestry, was born in Boston's Little Italy, the North End. He first appeared on network television in an automobile commercial for Toyota. Extolled for his menacing looks, his portrayal of the villain has since been quite frequent. Surprisingly adept at comedy, he also has appeared at Stand Up New York comedy club.

He starred on the TV series Breaking Vegas as the real-life counterfeiter, Louis Colavecchio, and had a recurring role as the Russian mobster, Vladimir, on the TV series Ocean Ave., starring Victoria Jackson and Megan Fox. He also appeared in the movies Señorita Justice as Carlos Rios, with Eva Longoria and Final Engagement as gangster John Knight, with Peter Greene. He has made guest appearances on TV shows such as the Michael Jackson Trial and Untold Stories of the ER, and is well known for his Tony Soprano parody in an Andalusia Olive Oil commercial, with the tag line: "Are you wearing a wire?"

Fierro studied acting at Florida Atlantic University, where he graduated with degrees in marketing and international business, having started theater too late to pursue a Bachelor of Fine Arts. He continues to follow an acting career in New York.
