= Daisy Fuentes =

American actress and model (born 1966)

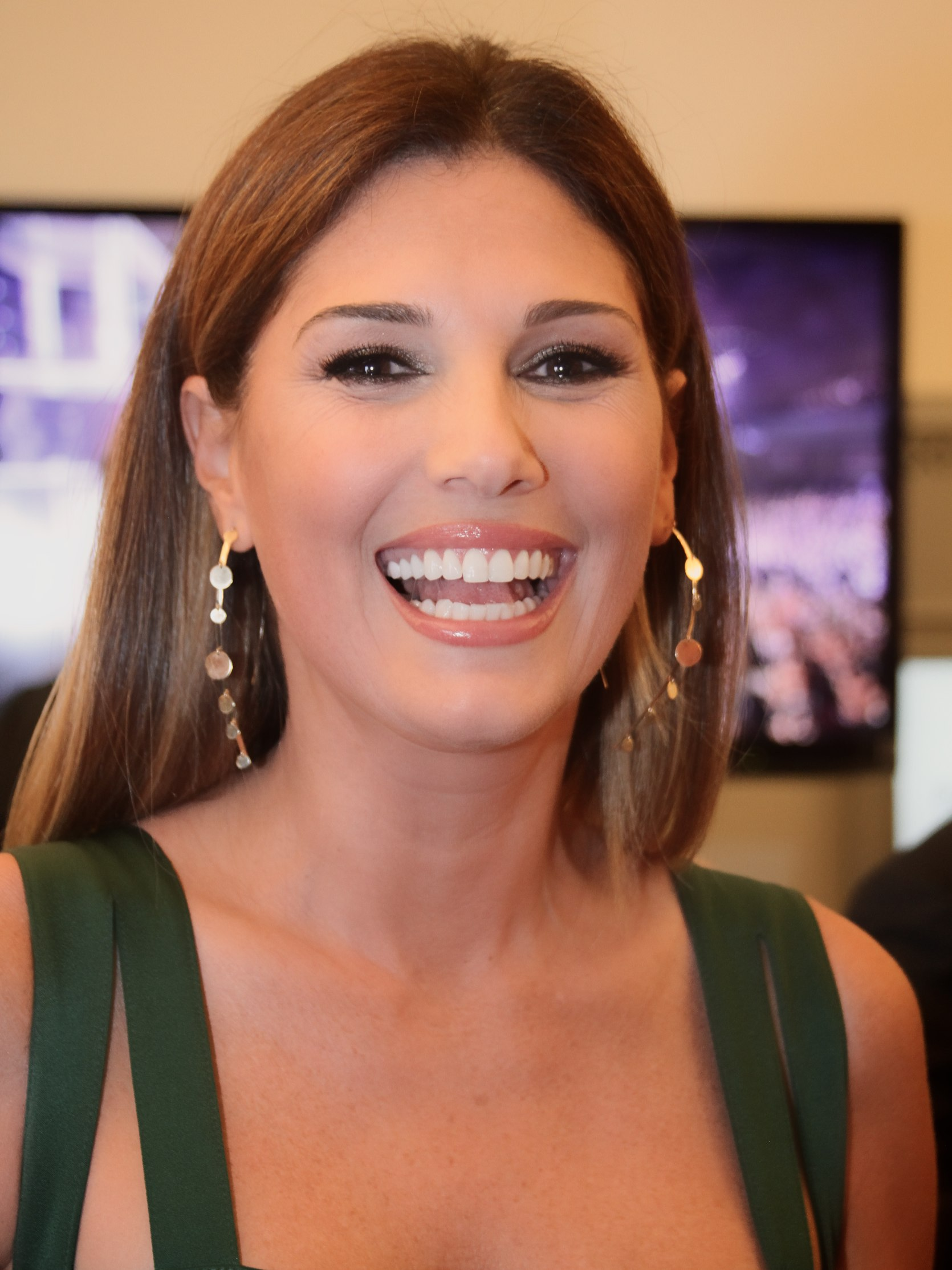
- Fuentes at the 2013 Alma Awards
- Born: November 17, 1966 (age 60); Havana, Cuba
- Citizenship: United States; Cuba
- Education: Bergen Community College, Paramus, New Jersey (majored in Communications)
- Occupations: Model; television host; actress; weather presenter
- Years active: 1983–present
- Known for: First Latina MTV VJ
- Spouses: Timothy Adams (m. 1991; div. 1995) Richard Marx (m. 2015)

Daisy Fuentes (born November 17, 1966) is an American model, television host, actress and former weather presenter. Fuentes became MTV's first Latina VJ (signed to MTV and MTV Latin America simultaneously) and Revlon's first Latina spokesperson to be signed to a worldwide contract.

== Early life and education ==
Daisy Fuentes was born on November 17, 1966, in Havana, Cuba, to a Cuban father and Spanish mother. In 1969, when Fuentes was three years old, her family fled the country to escape from Fidel Castro's rule and moved to Madrid, Spain. Four years later, she moved with her family to Harrison, New Jersey, US, where she attended Harrison High School, was voted homecoming queen and "best looking", and graduated in 1984. An aspiring hairstylist, she enrolled in cosmetology school with dreams of opening her own salon. Later, she enrolled at Bergen Community College where she majored in communications.

== Career ==
While still a college student, Fuentes was hired to present the weather at WNJU-TV 47, the local affiliate of Spanish-language TV network, Telemundo. Shortly after, Fuentes took a position with New York's Univision affiliate WXTV-TV 41 where in addition to being the weather anchor, she reported for the evening news.

In 1988, in addition to her weather duties, Fuentes hosted MTV Internacional, a one-hour Spanish language music show that aired in Latin America and the U.S. on Telemundo Network which made her well known in the Spanish-language TV market in the U.S. and Latin America. Fuentes joined MTV in 1993, becoming the first Latina VJ in the U.S., while also hosting shows for MTV Latin America. While at MTV Fuentes was also a host of the fashion and modeling series, House of Style. She became one of that network's more popular hosts and soon was courted by companies to be a spokesmodel. She later landed a role on the ABC soap opera Loving. Fuentes appeared on shows such as Dream On, The Larry Sanders Show, Ghostwriter and Cybill. From 1994 to 1995 she hosted her own talk show, Daisy, on CNBC. She was the co-host of America's Funniest Home Videos, along with John Fugelsang, from 1998 to 1999 making her the only female host of the show. She hosted the ALMA Award, Dick Clark's New Year's Rockin' Eve, the 1998 World Music Awards, the 1999 Billboard Latin Awards, and the Miss Teen USA, Miss USA, and Miss Universe pageants. She guest-starred in the TV series Queen of Swords episode "Running Wild" in 2000, as well as on Baywatch. Also in 2000, she starred opposite Steve Borden (professional wrestler 'Sting') in the made-for-TV movie Shutterspeed.

Fuentes has appeared on many magazine covers and has starred in television advertisements for Revlon, Pantene, American Express, M&M's and others. She was the first Mind, Body, Spirit Superstar, which was created to generate awareness of top women's health causes and work to promote change. In 2005, Fuentes appeared on the three page cover of People en Español's "50 most beautiful" women. Fuentes has hosted numerous TV shows and specials.

In 2004 Fuentes successfully launched the first clothing line bearing her name.

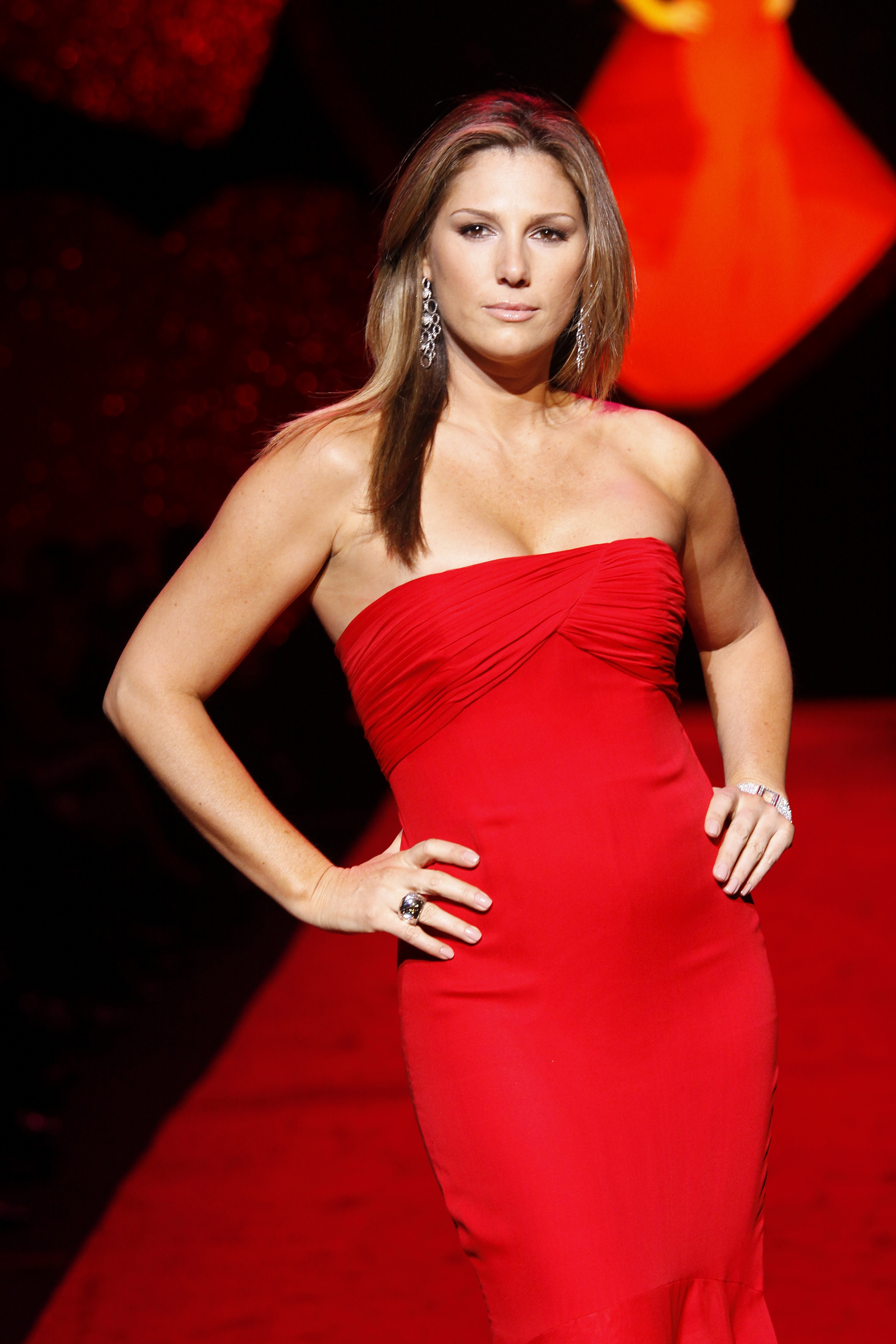
Fuentes modelling in the 2009 Heart Truth show

She made her debut in the haircare category with an all-natural hair care line called Daisy Fuentes Style Pro in March 2009 to mass retailers. Her workout game for the Wii, Daisy Fuentes Pilates, was released in August 2009.

In the early 2010s, Fuentes sold about $300 million a year of her branded goods, including hair care, fragrances, clothing, sunglasses, and accessories at Kohl's department stores.

Fuentes signed a prescription-eye wear licensing deal with Zyloware for a women's Latina-driven collection of prescription glasses.

Currently, Fuentes is co-presenter of La Voz Kids on Telemundo, the Spanish-language TV version of the show The Voice with kids and judges Paulina Rubio, Prince Royce, and Roberto Tapia.

Fuentes offered relationship advice on the "Matty's Dating Advice Corner" segment of the Fantasy Focus podcast with Matthew Berry.

Her fashion brand's current parent company Nine West Holdings filed for bankruptcy in 2018.

== Philanthropy ==
In addition to her work as an actress and model, Fuentes has become actively involved in charity, helping raise money for breast cancer research and St. Jude Children's Research Hospital. Daisy Fuentes speaks often in support of charities including the March of Dimes and Starlight Children's Foundation. Fuentes has been the celebrity chairman for the annual St. Jude Angeles & Stars gala in Miami since its debut in Miami more than 7 years ago, raising millions of dollars for this organization. In 2007, Fuentes worked for Girls On the Run, a non-profit prevention program that encouraged preteen girls to develop self-respect and healthy lifestyles through running. Fuentes hosted "A New Leaf" on NBC Saturday mornings in 2019, sponsored by Ancestry.com. "A New Leaf" followed everyday people on the cusp of key life inflection points, using family history, genealogy and sometimes DNA analysis to help guide them on their journey of self‑discovery. Fuentes has also worked with many breast cancer awareness causes such as the Revlon / UCLA Women's Breast Cancer Research program. She received an award at The Wellness Community West Los Angeles Tribute to the Human Spirit Awards dinner for her commitment to spreading breast cancer awareness, particularly in the Latino community.

== Personal life ==
Fuentes considers Harrison, New Jersey, to be her home, even though her parents left New Jersey for Miami.

Fuentes was married to actor and model Timothy Adams from 1991 to 1995. She met Luis Miguel when she interviewed him in 1995; the pair dated for three years before breaking up in 1998. She went on to date singer/songwriter Matt Goss, and he moved into her Hollywood Hills home, and they were engaged in 2003 but did not marry and broke off the relationship in January 2010.

Fuentes started dating singer/songwriter/producer Richard Marx in August 2013. On December 23, 2015, Fuentes and Marx married.
