= Timothy Adams (actor) =

American actor and model

- Born: Timothy Christopher Adams; August 4, 1967 (age 58); Belleville, New Jersey, U.S.
- Occupations: Actor, model
- Years active: 1995–present
- Spouse: Daisy Fuentes (m. 1991; div. 1995)

Timothy Christopher Adams (born August 4, 1967) is an American actor and fashion model. He made his screen debut appearing in the 1995 action film, Die Hard with a Vengeance and from 1997 to 1999 starred as Casey Mitchum in the NBC soap opera, Sunset Beach. Since then, Adams starred as a lead character in the 2002-2003 soap opera, Ocean Ave., portrayed Brucie Kibbutz in the video game Grand Theft Auto IV, and guest-starred in a number of television series. As a model, he appeared on the covers of more than 100 romance novels.

== Early life ==
Adams was born in Bellville, New Jersey and grew up in Harrison, New Jersey, the middle child of five. He was a student at Queen of Peace High School in North Arlington, New Jersey and Harrison High School in Harrison. He received a BA in Computer Science in New Jersey City University and was a partner in a trucking company before he started his career in show business. He received recognition as an actor when he signed with a modeling agency.

== Career ==
Adams gained his first credited role in the 1995 film Die Hard with a Vengeance. He later started his soap opera career with his role on the short-lived NBC drama Sunset Beach as Casey Mitchum from 1997 to 1999. After a few appearances on television shows and films, he returned to soap operas playing Rob Layne on Guiding Light, a role he played in 2000. In 2002 he was cast as lead character in the Swedish-American soap opera, Ocean Ave.. Adams made his major film debut in the 2003 summer blockbuster Bad Boys II, where he worked alongside Will Smith and Martin Lawrence.

He has been a fitness model since being discovered by renowned modeling photographer John Yannella during his Sunset Beach days, having been seen on the cover of Men's Health several times as well as being the featured model on the cover and within Jeff Csatari's book Your Best Body at 40+, by Rodale, Inc. in Emmaus, Pennsylvania (also publishers of the magazine).

He played Ron Walsh, on a recurring basis, on the ABC soap opera One Life to Live, a role he has played on-and-off since 2003 to 2007. He also guest starred on Rescue Me in the third season, playing opposite Mike Lombardi. In April 2008 he appeared as a gossip reporter on 30 Rock. In 2010, Adams appeared for eight episodes in the role of Dr. Clayton on All My Children. He is the voice actor of Brucie Kibbutz in Grand Theft Auto IV. He also reprised his role as Brucie in Grand Theft Auto: The Ballad of Gay Tony and Grand Theft Auto Online.

Adams also made guest-starring appearances on Law & Order, Law & Order: Special Victims Unit, Law & Order: Criminal Intent, Law & Order: Organized Crime, Conviction, FBI, FBI: Most Wanted and Blue Bloods.

== Personal life ==
Adams was married to model and TV personality Daisy Fuentes from 1991 to 1995. They were high school sweethearts. He dated Sherri Saum from 1997 to 2003.

== Filmography ==
=== Film ===
Year	Title	Role	Notes
1995	Die Hard with a Vengeance	Gunther	
1999	The Virgin Suicides	Buzz Romano	Credited as Tim Adams
2003	Bad Boys II	DEA Van Agent	
2005	Little Manhattan	TV Cowboy	
2014	The Amazing Spider-Man 2	Pilot	
2022	Trophy Wife	Detective McKenzie	

=== Television ===
Year	Title	Role	Notes
1997–1999	Sunset Beach	Casey Mitchum	312 episodes
2000	Guiding Light	Rob Layne	2 episodes
2002–2003	Ocean Ave.	Thomas "Thom" O'Keefe	68 episodes
2005	Law & Order	Tom McGrath	Episode: "Obsession"
2005–2007	One Life to Live	Ron Walsh	7 episodes
2006	Conviction	Bob The Beast	Episode: "Madness"
2006	Rescue Me	Mike's Roommate	7 episodes
2006	Law & Order: Special Victims Unit	Brent Allen Banks	Episode: "Uncle"
2006	Law & Order	Attorney Tindell	Episode: "Corner Office"
2008	30 Rock	NY Post Guy	Episode: "MILF Island"
2008	Law & Order: Criminal Intent	Spencer London	Episode: "Contract"
2008	Life on Mars	John Philip Fisher	Episode: "My Maharishi Is Bigger Than Your Maharishi"
2010	All My Children	Dr. Clayton	8 episodes
2011	Unforgettable	Steve Latman	Episode: "Pilot"
2013	White Collar	Museum Guard	Episode: "Shoot the Moon"
2013	Golden Boy	David Reed	Episode: "Sacrifice"
2013	Hostages	Jack Cahill	Episode: "The Cost of Living"
2015	Blue Bloods	John Knight, ESU Captain	Episode: "Worst Case Scenario"
2016	The Blacklist	Dean Bradley	Episode: "Miles McGrath (No. 65)
2016	Pearl	Kurt	TV pilot
2018	FBI	Richard Cook	Episode: "Doomsday"
2018	Law & Order: Special Victims Unit	Army Staff Sgt. Tyler Jones	Episode: "Service"
2021	Law & Order: Organized Crime	Captain Chambliss	2 episodes

=== Video games ===
Year	Title	Role	Notes
2008	Grand Theft Auto IV	Brucie Kibbutz	GameSpy Character of the Year 2008; GameSpot Best New Character
2009	Grand Theft Auto: The Ballad of Gay Tony	Brucie Kibbutz	Supporting character
2011	Saints Row: The Third	Random Saint	
2013	Grand Theft Auto V	Brucie Kibbutz	Grand Theft Auto Online only
