= Tom Bailey (singer) =

English singer, DJ, composer, & record producer

- Born: London, England
- Genre: Deep house
- Occupations: DJ; musician; record producer
- Years active: 2015—present
- Labels: Spinnin'; Tipsy

Tom Bailey is an English singer, DJ, composer and record producer.

== Early life and career ==
In 2017, Bailey featured on the chill house song "Waiting" by producer Bjonr, as a vocalist. The song was released Tipsy Records. It was his second time collaborating with Bjorn, the first was in 2016 when he featured on the song "Broken", which was released via the Spinnin' Records sublabel, Source Recordings.

== Discography ==
=== Charted singles ===
Title	Year	Peak chart positions			Album
Title	Year	FRA	BEL (W)	BEL (Tip V)	Album
"Fade Into You" (Bjorn featuring Tom Bailey)	2015	—	—	38	Non-album singles
"Your Love" (Boris Way featuring Tom Bailey)	2017	87	37	—	Non-album singles
