= FCKH8 =

Anti-hate organization

FCKH8 is a for-profit company that was founded in 2010 and sells T-shirts and accessories featuring slogans with a social justice theme. The company has released several media marketing campaigns to accompany sales of their products, some of which have been the focus of criticism. FCKH8 has responded to this criticism by stating that their T-shirts could help spread awareness and spark conversations about the causes.

== Campaigns ==
=== Gay rights ===
FCKH8 has had several campaigns and products that center upon LGBT issues, such as a video aimed at the Chick-fil-A same-sex marriage controversy. In 2013, FCKH8 announced their intent to mail out 10,000 copies of the coloring book Misha & His Moms Go to the Olympics to Russian families in response to the then recently passed Russian gay propaganda law. The plan was met with concern from some social media users, who stated that possession of the books would put the families at risk of legal and physical harm.

FCKH8's celebrity ally campaigns have been dismissed as shallow and opportunistic. A popular Internet meme consists of a FCKH8 ad manipulated to quote Jennifer Lawrence saying "Gay rights!", parodying the low bar set for straight people to profit from LGBT activism.

=== Ferguson and anti-racism ===
In September 2014 FCKH8 released a video entitled Hey White People: A Kinda Awkward Note to America by #Ferguson Kids, which featured children from Ferguson wearing T-shirts created by the company while reading racism statistics and commenting upon stereotypes. The video ended with the mention that interested parties could purchase T-shirts from FCKH8 and that part of the proceeds would be donated to five anti-racism causes. The online magazine ColorLines heavily criticized the video, as they felt that FCKH8 was using racism as a marketing tool to sell T-shirts. FCKH8 responded to ColorLines by claiming that they were "creating controversy", criticizing their post as clickbait, and requested an apology.

The video has also received some criticism over the compensation the children received in the video and one of the parents stated that her children received about $50 compensation apiece for their performances.

=== Drop F-Bombs for Feminism ===
In October 2014 FCKH8 released the video Potty-Mouthed Princesses Drop F-Bombs for Feminism. The video consists of young girls aged six to thirteen talking about gender inequality in society. The children use profanity during the video, in particular the word "fuck". Like the Ferguson video, the video features T-shirts sold by FCKH8 and the statement that $5 from the sale of each shirt will be donated to five related causes.

The video was heavily criticized by media outlets, many of which accused FCKH8 of capitalizing upon feminist values in order to sell T-shirts. The Washington Post remarked that they felt the video was "provoking solely for provocation’s sake" and that the company "has built a veritable empire by throwing the veil of social good over more capitalist ambitions." Due to the reaction to the video Potty-Mouthed Princesses Vimeo and YouTube removed it from their sites, but later reinstated the video.

=== Other campaigns ===
Other campaigns created by FCKH8 centered around domestic abuse and feminism.

== Reception ==
FCKH8 has received criticism for their marketing campaigns, with most respondents criticizing the videos as a way to sell T-shirts. Critics of the company, such as the Christian Science Monitor, have criticized the campaigns, with the Christian Science Monitor stating that the Potty-Mouthed Princesses campaign "betrays a social media marketing perspective devoid of ethics", stating: "The video’s ethos is so steeped in a 'Generation Like' mindset that having the video widely 'liked' and 'shared' is clearly what matters most—resulting in the company’s decision to push girls as young as age six into the roles of cultural provocateurs." FCKH8 also received criticism from the parents of two children featured in the Hey White People video, as she felt her children's compensation was too low when considering the amount of money the company received from T-shirt sales.

The company's campaigns have also received some praise and defense, and a writer for Slate commented that Potty-Mouthed Princesses's effectiveness stemmed from YouTube videos that featured children cursing, as it is "fun to watch girls and boys shatter precious princess tropes and refreshing to see little kids straightforwardly announce the necessity of feminism at a time when grown men and women are still tip-toeing around the word". Some of the parents of children featured in the FCKH8 campaigns have also defended the works, stating that the videos helped raise awareness of sensitive topics.

=== FCKH8 response ===
FCKH8 has responded to the criticisms, stating that their videos are meant to raise awareness for various social causes and spark conversations. They also commented that they felt that the takedown of the Potty-Mouthed Princesses video was censorship, saying: "This censorship gets to the exact point that the girls in the video are making [...] that society finds it more offensive for a girl to say fuck than they do the fact that 1 out 5 women are sexually assaulted and raped." They have also stated that they are unafraid of the backlash from their campaigns, as they feel that the social causes are more important concerns.

Responding to concerns of profiteering with the sale of their anti-racism shirts, FCKH8 claimed that they did not make enough from T-shirt sales to make large profits.
