= Alac (DJ) =

French DJ & record producer (born 1991)

Boris Way
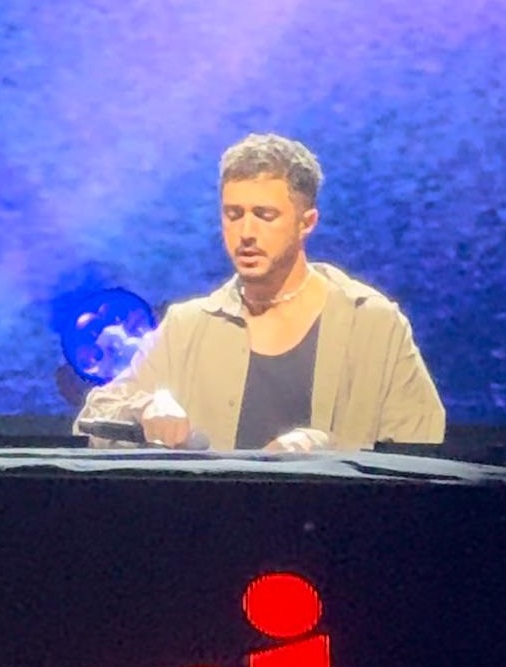

Background information
- Born: Boris Equestri; October 9, 1991 (age 35); Draguignan, France
- Origin: Nice
- Genres: progressive house; future house
- Occupations: DJ; producer
- Years active: 2009—present
- Labels: Ultra Records; Armada Deep; Armada Music Bundles; Parlophone; Spinnin' Deep; SPRS; The Bearded Man; Ultra Records; Beyond Worlds

Boris Equestri (born 9 October 1991), known professionally as Boris Way, or occasionally as ALAC, is a French DJ and record producer, signed to Ultra Records. He is the founder of the Love House style. Born in Draguignan and raised in Nice, he started his career in the deep house style, and then gradually moved to techno and progressive house. His famous singles "Your Love", "Kings & Queens", "Lose My Mind" took 87th, 78th and 76th places in the French charts respectively. In 2023 he is nominated for the NRJ Music Awards.

== Early life and career ==
Boris Equestri was born 9 October 1991, in Draguignan and spent his childhood in Cavalaire-sur-Mer. He played in rock bands in his early life and as a teenager, he played the guitar and the drums after having discovered his interest in clubbing. His career began as a disc jockey in clubs of Nice, which is the city he settled in. He performed at the Mas d'Estel beach area as a guest of fellow French DJ and producer Kungs, at the Summer Vibes festival in Saint-Aygulf as a guest of deep house duo Ofenbach and at Amnesia as a guest of his friend Quentin Mosimann.

Being resident DJ at L'Étoile, he began producing music and sent them to record labels before releasing two singles, "Sunday" and "Come Fire", with Spinnin' Records. He later signed a contract with Parlophone of Warner Music and released the single "Your Love". The song featured vocalist Tom Bailey, who was from the same publishing company as Equestri. The song was created when Bailey sent him a demo, which was eventually signed by Warner and was sent for radio airplay. In 2021, he signed a contract with Ultra Records.

In 2026, Boris announced a tour (a series of performances) at various festivals and club shows in France and Switzerland.

=== Style ===
Boris describes his style as Love House, combining emotional lyrics and a joyful interlude.

== Discography ==
=== Charted singles ===
Title	Year	Peak chart positions		Album
Title	Year	FRA	BEL (W)	Album
"Your Love" (featuring Tom Bailey)	2017	87	37	Non-album single
"Kings & Queens"	2023	78	—	Non-album single
"Lose My Mind"	2023	76	—	Non-album single
"Uber On Call"	2025	88	—	»

=== As Boris Way ===
- Boris Way - Bad Side (2011)
- Boris Way - Moments (2011)
- Boris Way - Seduction (2014)
- Boris Way & Tom Bailey - Your Love (2017)
- Boris Way & Carla Katz - Want You (2018)
- Boris Way & Kimberly Cole - Wasted Love (2019)
- Boris Way & Emy Perez - No More (Boom Boom) (2020)
- Boris Way - O Vai (2020)
- Boris Way & MAESIC - Ride (2020)
- Boris Way - Pink Soldiers (2021)
- Boris Way - Walking Away (2021)
- Boris Way & BANDANA - Gold (2022)
- Boris Way - Running Up That Hill (2i022)
- Boris Way - Kings & Queens (2022)
- Boris Way - Lose My Mind (2023)
- Boris Way - People Love (2023)
- Boris Way - Someone To Be Mine (2024)
- Boris Way & LAWRENT - People Of The Sun (2024)
- Boris Way & Justin Jesso - Save Me (2024)
- Boris Way - The Fall (2025)
- Boris Way & JAIMES - I Will Wait (2025)
- Boris Way - Uber On Call (2025)
- Boris Way - Prendemos (2025)
- Boris Way - Baby Baby (2025)
- Boris Way & ZANS - More (2025)
- Boris Way - Under Pressure (2026)
- Boris Way & Blake Light - Breath (2026)

=== As ALAC ===
- ALAC - If You Want It (2026)
- ALAC - Calling For You (2026)
- ALAC - A Thing From You (2026)

=== Remixes ===
- Tez Cadez - Seve (Boris Way Remix) (2024)
- Netsky & Bebe Rexha & Boris Way - Light That Leads Me (2025)

=== Passion Remixes ===
- Boris Way & BANDANA - Gold (2022)
- Boris Way - Kings & Queens (2022)
- Boris Way - Lose My Mind (2023)
- Boris Way - Someone To Be Mine (2024)
- Boris Way & LAWRENT - People Of The Sun (2024)
- Boris Way & Justin Jesso - Save Me (2024)

=== Mini-albums (EP) ===
- Feelings (2018)
