= Kimberly Cole =

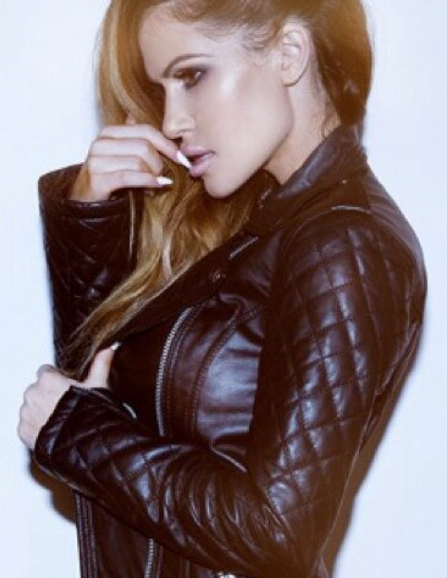
- Kimberly Cole in 2014

Background information
- Born: Orange County, California, U.S.
- Genres: Pop; dance
- Occupations: Singer; skater
- Instruments: Vocals; piano
- Labels: Atlantic; Bigbeat
- Website: kimberlycolemusic.com

Kimberly Cole is an American pop singer, songwriter, music correspondent, and host. She is signed with the William Morris Endeavor agency.

== Background ==
Cole has interviewed celebrities, bands, and other recording artists for MTV and the American Music Awards. Cole's Twitter account has over 2 million followers.

Cole has also been featured in MTV Style, Nylon Magazine, Idolator, and Billboard.

As an influencer, Cole has been a Buzzmaker for SpinMedia and Buzznet and, in 2015, worked with such brands as Rimmel London, Guess, Coach, Mattel, Old Navy, Cross Pens, Degree, and Suave. She has also appeared in commercials for Mountain Dew, Rubbermaid, Sony, and Skechers.

Most recently, Cole has worked as a creative director and executive producer with Critical Content and Get Lifted Film Co.

In November 2020, Cole also collaborated with UC San Francisco (UCSF), the Global Brain Health Institute (GNHI), and the San Francisco Conservatory of Music (SFCM) on a virtual event entitled "The Last Dance: Music, Improvisation, & the Resilient Brain." The event explored the effects of music on brain resilience and was inspired by Cole's song "Last Dance," along with her experiences with her father, who had frontotemporal dementia (FTD). The event included contributions from experts such as Charles Limb. Cole helped develop the program with UCSF, GBHI, and SFCM.

== Personal life ==
Cole has studied voice, piano, and dance since the age of four. As the daughter of a dentist and school principal, education was important from an early age. As long as her homework was done, she was encouraged to do anything she was interested in. As a result, she discovered her passion for singing and roller skating.

She is a professional artistic roller skater champion who has performed in competitions and was nationally recognized in her teens.

Cole earned a degree in theater at UCLA. An alumnus of Fountain Valley High School, she has served as a guest judge in the annual Voice of Fountain Valley competition at Fountain Valley High School. She is a quarter of Russian descent.

== Career ==
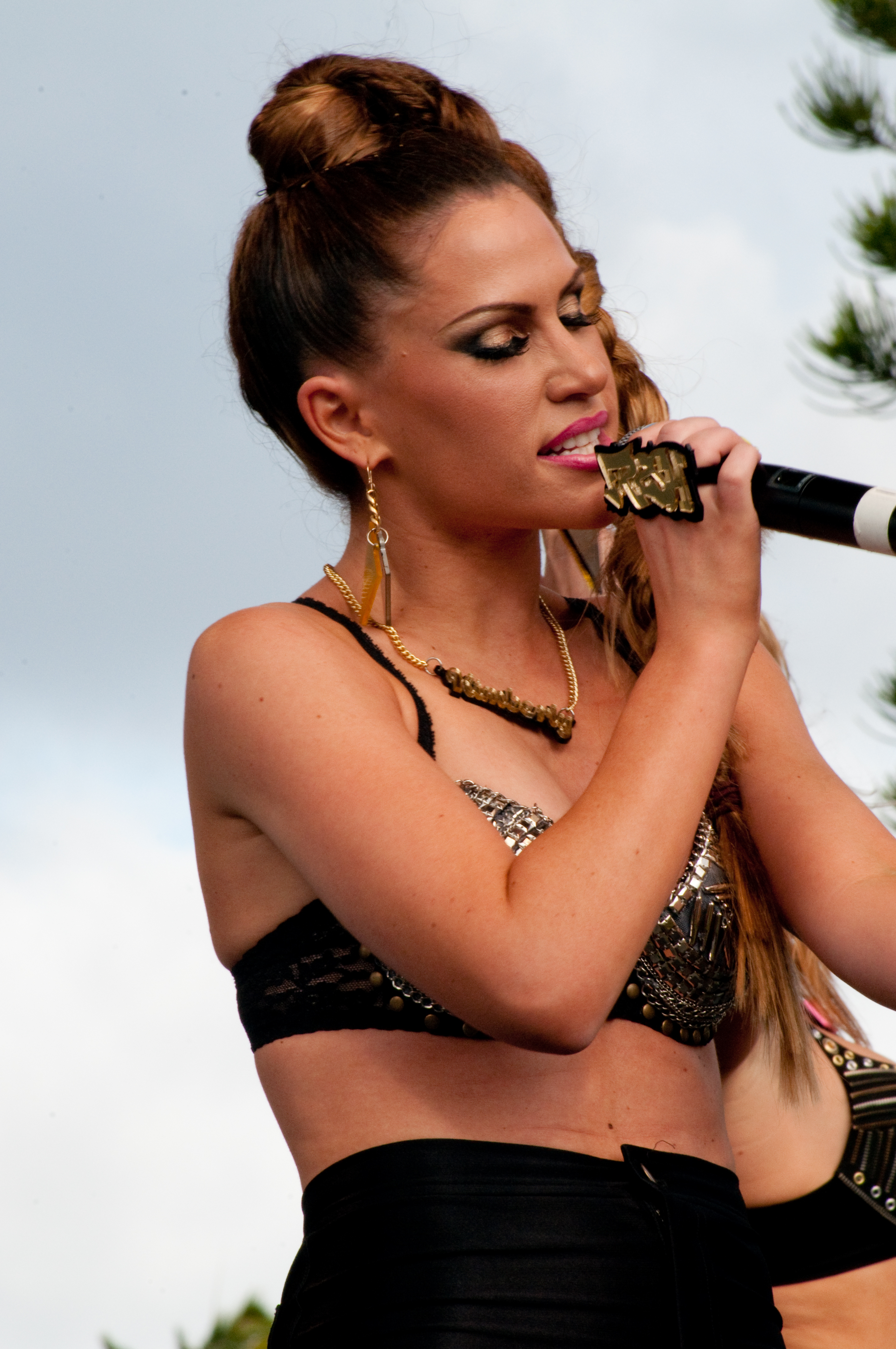
Kimberly Cole singing to Marines and sailors at the "For the Leathernecks Comedy and Entertainment Tour" in 2011.

Her performances have led her to write two songs for the movie Fame (2009).

Cole's debut album Bad Girls Club was released on iTunes in 2010, promoting Oxygen Network's The Bad Girls Club show. Her single and video "Smack You," in which she teamed up with famed choreographer Tricia Miranda to produce, saw success and led to the song being featured throughout season 5 of the show. Cole and Miranda were touted as "artistic soulmates" and worked together for several years after that.

The multiplatform release was the first co-branded album for Oxygen Media, promoted with an extensive social media campaign hashtagged #UpToNoGood.

In 2011, Cole's song "I Know" was featured in Mean Girls 2.

At MTV's VMA Radio Forum in 2012, Cole told Celebuzz she would shave her head in support of their annual Stand Up to Cancer event; Cole is quoted saying, "I would absolutely do that. I’m so passionate about my family, my friends. It’s all love. That’s what we’re here for. That’s why we make music," showing her support alongside celebrities such as Gwyneth Paltrow, Justin Timberlake, and Taylor Swift. They were in attendance at the annual Stand Up to Cancer televised event.

In 2014, Cole's song "Smack You" charted at number 19 on the Billboard Hot Dance Club Songs chart before peaking at number four, spending 13 weeks on the chart, and as a result, the album continued to serve as the soundtrack for season 6 of The Bad Girls Club. "Smack You" was also featured in the "What's Hot" and "New and Noteworthy" sections on the iTunes Store.

In 2016, Cole's song "U Make Me Wanna" (with Eddie Amador and featuring GT Garza) was featured in Basketball Wives LA. In 2016, her song "Nitty Gritty" was also featured on the season finale of season 19 of Dancing with the Stars, where Duck Dynasty teen Sadie Robertson and pro partner Mark Ballas performed their samba/quickstep to the track.

Cole graced the covers of magazines such as Ouch, Nouveau, and Fault in 2016 and was one of a long list of stars seen on the cover of Fault Magazine's "Millions" issue, including those such as Demi Lovato, Usher, Kevin Spacey, and Uma Thurman.

In 2019, Cole released the single "Wasted Love," a collaboration with DJ Boris Way. The song was released under Parlophone and Warner Music France, and garnered heavy rotation radio airplay on dance stations in Europe and worldwide. The song was also included in several playlists on streaming platforms such as Spotify.

In 2019, Cole also worked as a creative director on Todrick Hall's music video for the song "Nails, Hair, Hips, Heels."

In 2021, Cole worked as an editor on the music video for Summer Walker's single "Body," directed by Lacey Duke.

== Songwriting ==
Kimberly Cole has written and co-written all of her material, as well as songs for a variety of other artists, including Inna ("Crazy Sexy Wild") and Chris Willis ("Faded"), as well as Linnea's hit "Dance Through Fire" which reached #30 on the Billboard charts.

In an AXS article, Kimberly was praised as "one of very few writers who can ride that line between pop and poetry because her trademark edgy word choice is ever tempered with astute observations and sharp wit."

Critic David Kenniston at Vertigo Shtick calls her "A 'dance' artist who can sing, write, and dance like no one's business."

== Performances ==
Cole has performed with Lenny Kravitz, Jessica Simpson, Will Smith, and Mýa, as well as being the support act for megastar artists such as Katy Perry, LMFAO, Lupe Fiasco, Cobra Starship, and Shiny Toy Guns.

In 2009, she co-starred alongside Eliza Dushku, featuring as a background singer in the FOX TV series Dollhouse, as well as contributing the title theme (which she wrote and performed) and two other songs for the episode "Stage Fright." She has also been featured as a celebrity guest judge on VH1's Saddle Ranch.

Cole has performed at such world known venues at Webster Hall in New York City, Sugar Factory at The Mirage and Revolution Lounge in Las Vegas, the Playboy Mansion's Stars and Stripes Event, Jeffrey Sanker's Palm Springs White Party, and at Coachella's Oasis VIP Event as well as numerous after parties.

She performed live at The Colony in Los Angeles as the headliner of the Colony Royale New Year's Eve 2011 party.

Internet celebrity Nathan Barnatt auditioned for a role in her "U Make Me Wanna" music video. The resulting footage became a viral video. Barnatt also appears in the final cut, as Cole and her team reworked their original concept of the video to include his performance. In 2012, she also teamed up with numerous comics (most notably, Gabriel Iglesias) to perform for the US Marines as part of the Leatherneck Comedy Entertainment Tour.

Cole has toured and performed numerous occasions in East Asia, including almost two full months in China in late 2015, as well as a tour in Korea and three months in Japan for the US Armed Forces in 2016.

== Other ventures ==
In 2012, she hosted the live online pre-show for the 40th anniversary American Music Awards, as well as the weekly web series "AMAs on Demand" alongside Lance Bass and Megan Turney.

Cole was a presenter at the 2014 International Fashion Film Awards; other presenters included Lance Bass, Jordin Sparks, Kristin Cavallari, and Mark Ballas. In 2016, she also appeared alongside Lance Bass to host an episode of What's Trending, a live interactive show on YouTube that brings you the top trending news and videos being shared across the web.

== Artistry ==
Kimberly starred in three viral videos produced by Todrick Hall of MTV Fame, including "Spell Block Tango," "Snow White and the Seven Thugs," and "Cinderfella." Among the star-studded cast of appearances were Glee's Amber Riley, Adam Lambert, Victoria Justice, Shoshana Bean, Cassie Scerbio, Pia Toscano, Lance Bass, and Todrick himself.

Throughout her career, Cole's sound has been characterized by sassy lyrics in genres ranging from dance-pop to experiments with dubstep, electronic, and reggae influences (as seen on her EP The Prelude). Nylon Magazine described her 2013 single "Found Better" as sounding like "Gwen Stefani at her most reggae paired with major EDM beats."

After having been featured in a 2015 PAZ Remix of Rihanna, Kanye West, and Paul McCartney's "FourFiveSeconds," Grant Austin of EDM Assassin states, "What really sets this remix out though is that the vocals are by Kimberly Cole and not Rihanna. He pulled out all the stops with adding her!"

== Discography ==
=== Studio albums ===
| Title | Album details |
|---|---|
| Bad Girls Club | Released 21 December 2010; Label: Crystal Ship; Formats: digital download |

=== Extended plays ===
| Title | Album details |
|---|---|
| Nitty Gritty | Released 22 January 2008; Label: Crystal Ship; Formats: digital download |
| Superstar | Released 27 January 2009; Label: Crystal Ship; Formats: digital download |
| The Prelude | Released February 2014; Label: Crystal Ship; Formats: digital download |

=== Singles ===
| Title | Year | Album | Comments |
|---|---|---|---|
| "Smack You" | 2010 | Bad Girls Club | Billboard Dance Club #4 |
| "Arrow Through My Heart" (with Eddie Amador feat. Garza) | 2011 | TBA | Billboard Dance Club #16 |
| "U Make Me Wanna" (with Eddie Amador feat. Garza) | 2012 | TBA | Billboard Dance Club #13 |
| "Like It" | 2013 | The Prelude | |
| "Found Better" | 2013 | The Prelude | |
| "Let Me Go" | 2014 | The Prelude | |
| "One More Time- Extended" (with Lynn Wood) | 2015 | Single | |
| "Moments (Generation)" (with Boris Way) | 2015 | Single | |
| "Wild Side" (with Danny Olson) | 2015 | Single | |
| "FourFiveSeconds ft. Kimberly Cole (PAZ Remix)" | 2015 | Single | |
| "Something" (with Boris Way) | 2016 | Armada Deep - Four to the Floor EP | |
| "Wildside" (with PAZ) | 2018 | Single | |
| "Wasted Love" (with Boris Way) | 2019 | Single / The Remix Album Wasted Love (The Remixes) and EP Feelings | On Parlophone / Warner Music France |
