= Eddie Amador =

- Also known as: Edward Louis
- Born: Edward Amador
- Genres: House
- Years active: 1993–present
- Labels: Carrillo Music, Subliminal, Spinnin'
- Website: www.facebook.com/eddieamador/

Eddie Amador (born 1967) is best known as an international house music record producer, remixer and DJ. He penned the song "House Music" in 1997, and is an established icon in that music genre.

== Biography ==
Amador's productions in 2011 included "Spirituality" on Erick Morillo’s Subliminal label and 10 Lil Indians on Amador's imprint, Citrusonic Recordings. Eddie's records are supported by well-known DJs including David Guetta, Kaskade, Annie Nightingale, D.O.N.S., Robbie Rivera, Thomas Gold, and others. His record "We Are the Beautiful Ones" is co-produced with Harry "Choo Choo" Romero, and vocalist Countre Black released on Subliminal. A new remix of "We Are the Beautiful Ones" by Sympho Nympho (Erick Morillo, Harry Romero and Jose Nunez) will appear on the latest Subliminal Compilation for WMC 2012. Eddie also teamed up with Automatic Panic on "Morning After" the current single on his Citrusonic Recordings imprint supported by Mark Knight, Steve Aoki and Judge Jules.

Amador's fame started in 1997 when he penned the song House Music, featuring the line "not everyone understands house music, it's a spiritual thing, a body thing, a soul thing", spoken over a hypnotic pulsating beat, which consequentially became a seminal dance classic. It went on to become a global hit and secured Amador an album deal with Deep Dish's Yoshitoshi label. However, it was his next single "Rise" that proved his appeal as entered the UK Top 20 giving him exposure as an international class DJ with him performing at famous club venues like Ministry of Sound, The Queen, Centro Fly, Crobar, Stereo as well as Pacha & Space in Ibiza. Based on his success, he set up a second studio in Amsterdam in 2003 where he continued productions for Defected, Nero, and Yoshitoshi.

He has remixed for Madonna, Leela James, Michael Bublé and Seal for Warner Bros. Records and Reprise Records. He became part of the exclusive group to remix Madonna and his mix of "Give It to Me" from Hard Candy reached #1 on Billboards Hot Dance Club Play Chart. He has gone on to remix Yoko Ono, The Veronicas, Alanis Morissette, Audio Playground, Sliimy, Donna Summer, Chris Willis, Kimberly Cole, Jason Derulo, Kerli, Blush, and many many more.

In 2015, Eddie Amador received a Grammy Nomination for Remixer of the year for his remixes of the group Five Knives "The Rising".
