= Skinny (directing team) =

Directing team specializing in commercials and music videos

Skinny , stylized as SKINNY, is a directing team based in Los Angeles that specializes in commercials and music videos. It is composed of David Hache (1982-2024) and Marc-Edouard Leon. In 2008, SKINNY signed to the acclaimed music video and commercial production company Partizan.

== Media attention ==
SKINNY's music video for Devendra Banhart's song "Carmensita" garnered a lot of public attention thanks to the presence of actors Natalie Portman, Kat Dennings and Lukas Haas. In particular, news that Devendra Banhart and Natalie Portman began dating after meeting on the set of the video was reported in the tabloids. The music video, which pays homage to Bollywood films and TV shows of the 1960s and 1970s based on ancient Indian epics of Mahabharata and Ramayana, has since become one of the most celebrated videos of 2008. It was featured in The Guardian, MTV, Subterranean, Time Magazine, NME, Rolling Stone, People Magazine, Perez Hilton and E! Moreover, Spin Magazine voted the video the 10th Best Video of 2008 and MTV's indie rock music video show Subterranean included it in its Top 15 of 2008.
