= Dave Audé =

American DJ, producer and remixer

- Also known as: JX Riders; D'Still'D; Extension 119; Needle Damage; R3drum; Rich Kidz; Jada
- Born: Dave Aude; Van Nuys, Los Angeles, California
- Genres: House; Dance-pop; Progressive house
- Occupations: Record producer; Songwriter; DJ; Remixer
- Years active: 1995–present
- Labels: Audacious; Cherrytree; Ultra; Moonshine
- Website: daveaude.com

Dave Audé (/ˈɔːdeɪ/) is an American DJ, producer, and remixer. He operates his own label, Audacious Records, and is known for holding the record for the most number ones of any producer on the Billboard Dance Club Songs chart, with 135 chart-topping remixes and singles. He has done production and remix work for artists such as U2, will.i.am, t.A.T.u., Katy Perry, Lady Gaga, Barenaked Ladies, Faith No More, Rihanna, Yoko Ono, Britney Spears, Alexis Jordan, Madonna, CeCe Peniston, Jennifer Lopez, Celine Dion, LeAnn Rimes, Selena Gomez, Olivia Holt, Laura Pausini, and Beyoncé.

In 2016, Audé won the Grammy Award for Best Remixed Recording for his remix of "Uptown Funk" by Mark Ronson and Bruno Mars. His songs are represented by Downtown Music Publishing, and he is managed by songwriter and producer Darrell Brown.

== Career ==
Audé is the older brother of former Major League Baseball player Rich Audé. At age 22, he began his career as a MIDI instructor at the Los Angeles Recording Workshop. During the 1990s, he began producing house music at Truth, a Los Angeles dance club, and formed Lunatic Fringe with the club's owner, Steve Levy. Together, they founded the record label Moonshine Music and built a studio in West Hollywood.

In 2006, Audé founded his own imprint, Audacious Records, to release his original tracks.

In 2008, he appeared on the television show Pussycat Dolls Present: Girlicious as part of Robin Antin's expert team to help the contestants with vocal rehearsals. Audé also served as the musical director for The Pussycat Dolls' Doll Domination Tour. On New Year's Eve 2023, Audé performed a live set featuring music from his full-length LP Motions that was broadcast on 14 West Coast television stations to over 70 million households.

=== Chart achievements and Grammy Awards ===
Throughout his career, Audé has scored 14 hit singles as a lead artist on the US Billboard Dance Club Songs chart. His early entries included "Floor Filler Tune" in 1999 and "Common Ground" in 2006. He later achieved numerous number-one singles as an artist, including: "Make It Last" (with Jessica Sutta) in 2007; "Grass Is Greener" (with Sisely Treasure) in 2009; "Figure It Out" (with Isha Coco, a.k.a. Luciana) in 2010; "I'm Still Hot" (with Luciana) in 2011; "Never Forget" (featuring Lena Katina), "Something for the Weekend" (with Luciana), and "Hold Me" (with Yoko Ono) in 2012; "Electricity & Drums (Bad Boy)" (with Akon and Luciana) in 2013; and "Take Me Away" (with Rokelle), "Aftermath (Here We Go)" (with Andy Bell), "Hustlin'" (with Vassy and Crazibiza), and "True Original" (with Andy Bell) in 2014.

As a producer and remixer, Audé holds the record for the most number-one hits on the Billboard Dance Club Songs chart. He achieved his 100th number-one track in 2014, and as of 2023, he has reached an unprecedented 135 number-one tracks on the chart.

Audé has received three Grammy Award nominations for Best Remixed Recording, winning once:

- In 2010, he was nominated for his remix of Dean Coleman's "I Want You".
- In 2016, at the 58th Annual Grammy Awards, he won the award for his remix of Mark Ronson and Bruno Mars's hit single "Uptown Funk".
- In 2022, at the 64th Annual Grammy Awards, he was nominated for his remix of Demi Lovato and Ariana Grande's "Met Him Last Night".

== Discography ==
- Audacious (2006)
- 2 Audacious (2009)
- Audacious 3 (2011)
- Audacious Summer 2011 Sampler (2011)
- Audacious 4 (2013)
- Audacious Summer Vol. 1 (2014)
- Motions (2022)
