= Make It Last (Dave Audé song) =

Single by Dave Audé feat. Jessica Sutta
- Released: May 25, 2007
- Genre: Electronic
- Length: 9:16; 3:36 (Radio Edit)
- Label: Audacious Records
- Songwriters: Dave Audé, Sisely Treasure
- Producer: Dave Audé

Dave Audé feat. Jessica Sutta singles chronology
"Make It Last" (2007)	"White Lies" (2007)

"Make It Last" is a single by American DJ & producer Dave Audé. The song was released on May 25, 2007, through Audacious Records and features former Pussycat Doll, Jessica Sutta.

== Background ==
Dave Audé spoke about his collaboration with Sutta, stating,

"Jessica was one of the Pussycat Dolls that didn't get a lot of the spotlight in the actual Pussycat band, but she just loves club music. So I've been doing a few songs here and there. I recorded the vocals for her song with Paul Van Dyk's 'White Lies.' She sang on my song which wasn't a full vocal song but it had some, it was more of a club track and fortunately went to number one."

== Track listing ==
- US digital download
1. "Make It Last (Original Club Mix)"- 9:16
2. "Make It Last (Ralphi Rosario Remix)" - 9:41
3. "Make It Last (Emjae Vocal Remix)" -7:21
4. "Make It Last (Emjae Dub)" - 7:00
- 2026 Version
1. "Make It Last (Edit)" - 3:48
2. "Make It Last (Extended)" - 6:18

== Charts ==
“Make it Last” reached the #1 spot on Billboard's Hot Dance Play charts during the week of September 22, 2007. |- |}

Chart (2007)	Peak position
US Billboard Hot Dance Club Play	1

== See also ==
- List of number-one dance singles of 2007 (U.S.)
