= Again (Jessica Sutta song) =

Single by Jessica Sutta featuring Kemal Golden
- Released: March 26, 2013
- Genre: Electropop; dance-pop; house; dance
- Length: 4:11 (Radio Edit)
- Label: Citrusonic Records
- Songwriters: Jessica Sutta; Kemal Golden; Alana Da Fonseca; Cameron Nacson
- Producer: Kemal Golden

Jessica Sutta singles chronology
"Show Me" (2011)	"Again" (2013)	"Lights Out" (2013)

Kemal Golden singles chronology
"Again" (2013)

"Again" is a song by American recording artist Jessica Sutta which featured American musician, deejay and record producer Kemal Golden. It was released as her second single from her scrapped debut album Sutta Pop, via Citrusonic Records. The song was written by Sutta, Golden, Alana Da Fonseca and Cameron Nacson and produced by Golden. It was released on March 26, 2013. The track comes after the release of Sutta's number 1 dance single "Show Me" (2011). The extended version and remixes of "Again" were released on May 28, 2013. The song was a hit on the Dance Club Songs chart, peaking at #14 on the week of July 13, 2013.

== Background and release ==
"Again" is an uplifting electropop, dance-pop, house and dance song with elements of EDM genres. It was written by Sutta, Golden, Alana Da Fonseca and Cameron Nacson, and produced by Golden. The song marks an intriguing next step for the former girl group member of the Pussycat Dolls. Sutta has already scored a Hot Dance Charts hit with her 2011 single "Show Me," but the 30-year-old pop singer tells Billboard that "Again" is a particularly personal dance track. "It talks about the cyclone of energy that happens when the wrong decisions are made in your life over and over again," she says. "Whether it's a lifestyle choice or a bad relationship, it talks about a darker part of my life, but there is always a light at the end of the tunnel. I'm grateful for every experience in my life no matter how good or bad they are. It makes me who I am."

== Critical reception ==
The song received positive reviews from critics and fans. It was described as "emotionally uplifting song with a huge chorus backed by melodic synths and breathtaking vocals by Jessica Sutta. Packed with dancefloor highs and smart lyrics, this anthemic track was produced by and features Kemal Golden. DjGrind.net wrote that "Again" is an instant dance floor filler, with a driving beat, soaring synths and huge vocals from Jessica. MTV buzzworthy wrote: |The new track recalls the twinkling, summery House sound of Kelly Rowland's "When Love Takes Over." But it's not such a sweet serenade: "And then you do it again/ 'Cause you needed to feed the sensation," Sutta cries out on the aching club cut edging toward a heavy beat breakdown, as she regretfully returns again and again to a less-than-sugary situation. It's an important lesson: Don't beat yourself up over a bad decision—just dance."

With an intro of invincibility and strength, Sutta allows her soft yet powerful vocals evoke a response from the listener before the dance beat and infectious synths completely take over. While the vibe may feel like one of a carefree nature, the emotional lyrics paint a different picture of an aching heart. "I’ll be waiting, faithful, patient, Always the savior, never, never the saved", she sings. NotableDance.com described "Again" as an epic dancefloor filler with catchy hooks that are primed for crossover. The airy synth line in the breakdowns are as pretty as the lyrics are dark, making the contrast even more defined. "Again" has one of the most creative lyric videos – combining performance and scenes with the lyric on the screen. Jessica's dancing and performance is quite emotional, which elevates the clip to a higher level as well.

== Music video ==
The music video, a hybrid of a performance and lyric video, premiered on VIBE on April 8, 2013, and was released on YouTube on Jessica's official VEVO channel on April 9, 2013. It was directed by Ryan Rabih Zeidan. "I wanted the audience to connect with the emotion of the song through Jessica's performance, not only the lyrics" says the director.

== Live performances ==
Sutta performed the song for the first time in Las Vegas at Krave on March 23, 2013. On May 14, she performed the song on AXS Live. She also performed an acoustic version of her unreleased song, "Daddy’s Girl" on the same show.

== Track list ==
Digital download single

1. "Again" (feat. Kemal Golden) [Radio Edit] – 4:11

Remixes 1

1. "Again" (feat. Kemal Golden) [Extended] – 5:53
2. "Again" (feat. Kemal Golden) [Hector Fonseca & Tommy Love Big Room Mix] – 7:35
3. "Again" (feat. Kemal Golden) [Hector Fonseca & Tommy Love Big Room Dub] – 6:46
4. "Again" (feat. Kemal Golden) [JRMX Club Mix] – 6:44
5. "Again" (feat. Kemal Golden) [JRMX Club Edit] – 4:12
6. "Again" (feat. Kemal Golden) [Jesse Voorn Remix] – 5:57
7. "Again" (feat. Kemal Golden) [Jesse Voorn Remix Instrumental] – 5:57
8. "Again" (feat. Kemal Golden) [Nikno Remix] – 6:35
9. "Again" (feat. Kemal Golden) [Nikno Dub] – 6:35
10. "Again" (feat. Kemal Golden) [Farley & Del Pino Bros. Club] – 6:09
11. "Again" (feat. Kemal Golden) [Farley & Del Pino Bros. Radio Edit] – 4:09
12. "Again" (feat. Kemal Golden) [IDeaL & J-Break Remix] – 5:38
13. "Again" (feat. Kemal Golden) [IDeaL & J-Break Dub] – 5:24

Remixes 2

1. "Again" (feat. Kemal Golden) [DJ Theresa Remix] – 6:49
2. "Again" (feat. Kemal Golden) [DJ Theresa Dub] – 6:45
3. "Again" (feat. Kemal Golden) [Dany Cohiba & The Henchmen Remix] – 5:51
4. "Again" (feat. Kemal Golden) [Emjae Club] – 5:45
5. "Again" (feat. Kemal Golden) [Emjae Club Instrumental] – 5:45
6. "Again" (feat. Kemal Golden) [Emjae Radio Edit] – 4:18
7. "Again" (feat. Kemal Golden) [Farley & Dickinson Club] – 6:40
8. "Again" (feat. Kemal Golden) [Farley & Dickinson Radio Edit] – 4:07
9. "Again" (feat. Kemal Golden) [Myke Rossi Remix] – 7:48
10. "Again" (feat. Kemal Golden) [Myke Rossi Dub] – 7:21
11. "Again" (feat. Kemal Golden) [Gianluca Cesaro & Venz DC aka DB Killers Remix] – 5:42
12. "Again" (feat. Kemal Golden) [Gianluca Cesaro & Venz DC aka DB Killers Remix Instrumental] – 5:42

== Charts ==
Chart (2013)	Peak position
US Dance Club Songs (Billboard)	14
