= Jessica Sutta =

American singer and songwriter (born 1982)

- Sutta in 2013

Background information
- Also known as: J Sutta
- Born: Jessica Lynn Sutta; May 15, 1982 (age 44); Miami, Florida, U.S.
- Genres: Pop; electropop
- Occupations: Singer; songwriter; dancer
- Years active: 2001–present
- Labels: Hollywood; Citrusonic; Premier League Music
- Formerly of: The Pussycat Dolls
- Spouse: Mikey Marquart (m. 2019)
- Partner(s): Joseph Slaughter (2009–2011); James Tobin (2012–2014)

Jessica Lynn Sutta (born May 15, 1982) is an American singer, songwriter, dancer and former actress. She is a former member of the girl group The Pussycat Dolls. As a solo artist, Sutta shelved her first attempt with a debut album, Sutta Pop (2012), but went on to release her mixtape, Feline Resurrection (2016) and her debut studio album, I Say Yes (2017). She has reached four number ones on US Dance Club Songs ("Show Me", "Make It Last", "I'm Gonna Get You" and "Distortion"), becoming the only former Pussycat Dolls' member to reach the top of an American chart.

Prior to her music career, Sutta became captain of the Miami Heat's cheerleading squad in her teens and she had a brief acting career in the films Bully (2001) and From Justin to Kelly (2003) and soap opera Ocean Ave. (2002–2003).

== Early life and education ==
Jessica Lynn Sutta was born in Miami, Florida to a Catholic and Jewish family of Russian and Polish descent. At the age of three, she was enrolled in various dance classes. She later attended Miami City Ballet and the New World School of the Arts at the age of 14 to further her dance skills.

When she was 17, Sutta tore her ACL on both knees and switched to theatre, thinking her dance career was over. Eventually, through rehabilitation Sutta's knees healed and joined NBA's cheerleading squad Miami Heat in 1999, becoming the captain in 2001.

== Career ==
=== 2001–2010: Acting and the Pussycat Dolls ===
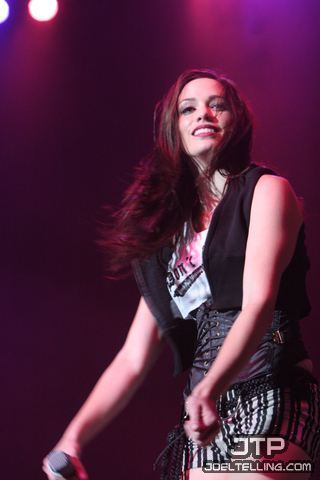
Sutta performing live in 2006

In 2001 Sutta debuted as an actress in the crime drama film Bully, directed by Larry Clark. From 2002 to 2003 she was cast as a series regular on Ocean Ave., in which she played Jody, a rich and arrogant teenager of an elite family. In 2003 she played Nadine in the romantic comedy film From Justin to Kelly. She moved to Los Angeles to work as a dancer and met choreographer Robin Antin, who asked her to join the Pussycat Dolls, along with Nicole Scherzinger, Melody Thornton, Carmit Bachar, Ashley Roberts and Kimberly Wyatt. The group achieved worldwide success with the singles "Don't Cha", "Stickwitu", "Buttons", and their multi-platinum debut album PCD (2005). Their second and final studio album Doll Domination (2008) contains hit singles "When I Grow Up", "I Hate This Part", and "Jai Ho!".

Despite their commercial success, the group was plagued by internal conflict due to the emphasis on Scherzinger and the subordinate treatment of the other members. In February 2010, for these reasons, Sutta, Wyatt, Roberts, and Thornton had announced their departures from the Pussycat Dolls and the group disbanded. Sutta said in an interview she was tired of living in "the shadow of Scherzinger".

=== 2010–2018: Feline Resurrection and I Say Yes ===
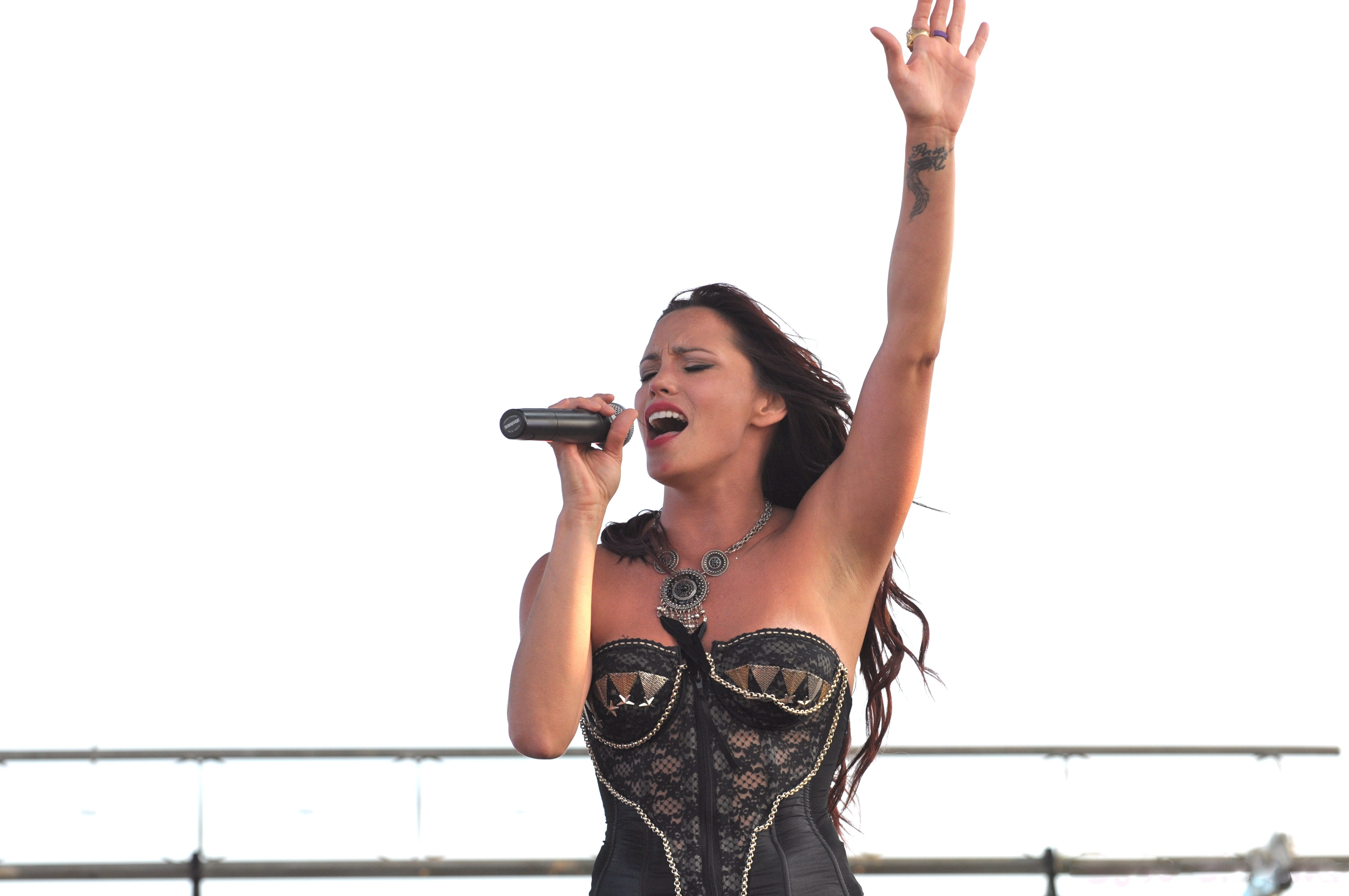
Sutta performing live in 2012

On September 19, 2010, Sutta released her debut solo single, "I Wanna Be Bad", as an independent artist, and the music video premiered exclusively on MTV. In 2011 Sutta signed with Hollywood Records and released her first single on a record label, "Show Me", on August 23. The song peaked at number one on the US Dance Club Songs, becoming the first former Pussycat Dolls to reach the top of an American chart. In 2012 she worked on her debut album, titled Sutta Pop and produced by Timbaland, RedOne and Busbee, recording songs such as "Amplify", "Good Boy", "Jack in the Box", "Disco Ball" and "Kissing the Sky". She also toured in festivals in US. Sutta planned to release "Make It Loud" as the lead single, but in October 2012 she was dropped from Hollywood and the album was canceled; the label said they didn't know how to promote her image into a catalog of teen artists. She has since stated that she still intends to release the album.

In 2013 she signed with the independent label Citrusonic Stereophonic and released two singles, "Again" on March 26 and "Lights Out" on August 20 – both songs reached top 5 on US Dance Club Songs. In 2014 she signed to another independent label, Premier League Music, and released "Candy". On the label, she released a series of singles, including "Bottle Bitch", "Let It Be Love", "Feline Resurrection" and "Damn! (I Wish I Was Your Lover)". On June 9, 2016, she released her debut mixtape, Feline Resurrection, just for free download on her website. The album compiled the five previously singles and twelve new songs. On March 3, 2017, she released her second work, I Say Yes, also her debut studio album commercially, produced by Dave Audé and Danny Majic. The album was promoted with singles "Forever", "I Say Yes", "Feel Like Making Love" and "Distortion", the latter became her fourth number one single on US Dance Club Songs.

=== 2019–present: The Pussycat Dolls reunion ===
On November 29, 2019, the Pussycat Dolls confirmed their comeback and, on February 7, 2020, they released a new single, "React", with a live performance on the finale of The X Factor: Celebrity. They announced a 36-date world tour, but plans were canceled due the worsening situation arising from the COVID-19 pandemic and the group ended the reunion in 2021.

In 2021, Sutta took a hiatus from her artistic career to become a mother.

In 2026, Sutta was not included in the Pussycat Dolls' 2026 reunion and subsequent tour, with Sutta not being informed of the announcement. She theorized her exclusion was because of her personal politics aligning with anti-vaccine activism, Robert F. Kennedy Jr., and MAGA. She made her musical comeback with the single, "Don't Take Much", produced by Dave Audé.

== Personal life ==
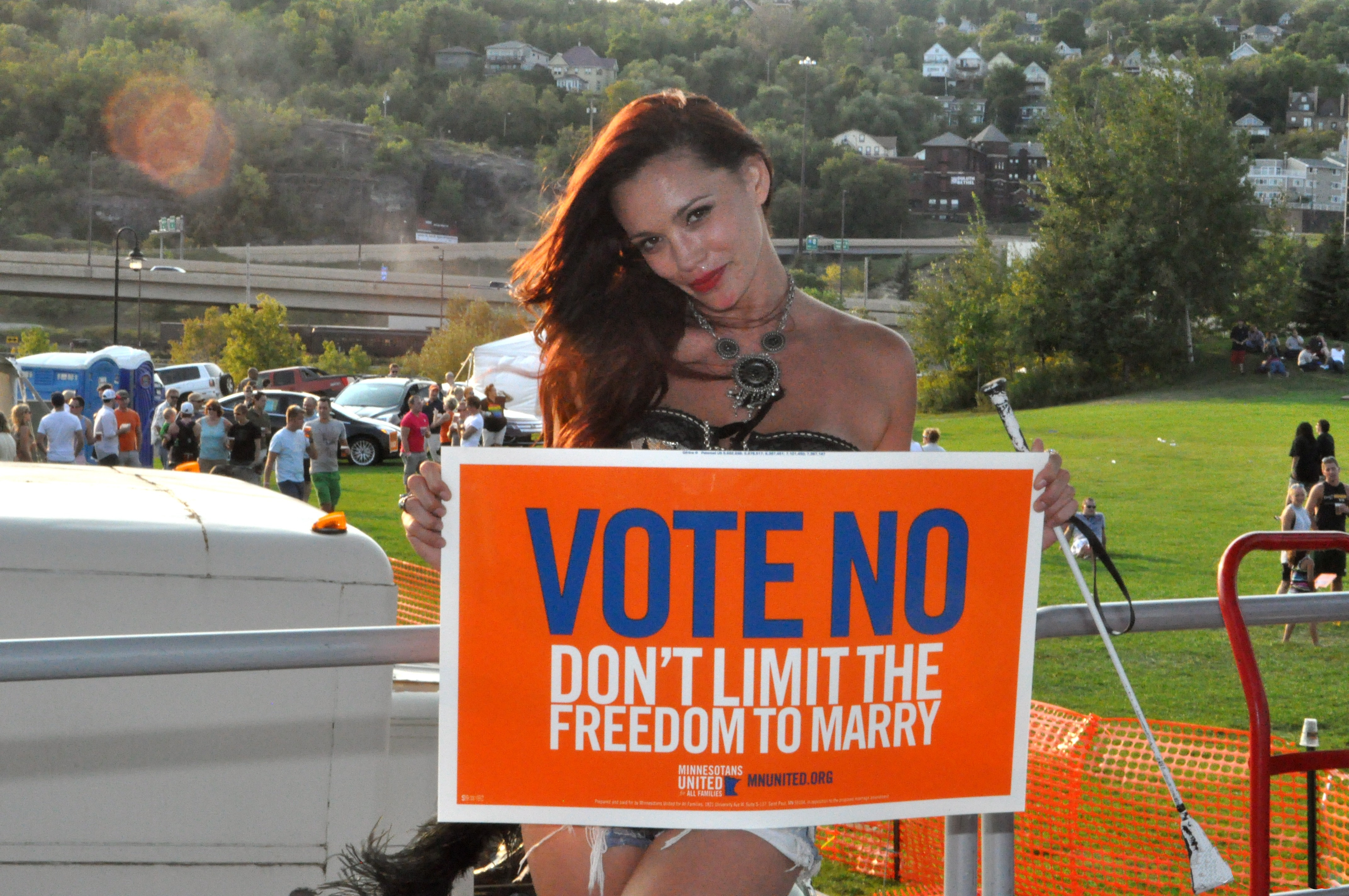
Sutta at LGBT Marriage Rights parade in 2012

From 2012 to 2014 she dated Australian presenter James Tobin. In 2016 Sutta met drummer Mikey Marquart and they married on September 14, 2019, in Malibu. In May 2021, Sutta gave birth to a boy, Michael Jesse. In the same year she suffered neuropathy.

At the height of the Pussycat Dolls popularity, Sutta was struggling with alcoholism. After the end of the group the problem got worse. She has abstained from alcohol since 2016 after entering in Miami Beach House Rehab Center.

=== Political views ===
Sutta is a supporter of gay rights. In December 2010, she appeared in a YouTube video by the LGBT for-profit company FCKH8, and a play on the NOH8 Campaign. In 2016, Sutta headlined the second annual Babes for Boobs bachelor auction benefitting Susan G. Komen L.A. She also headlined the Main Stage at San Francisco Pride and paid tribute to the victims and families of the Orlando nightclub shooting.

Sutta spoke out publicly for the vaccine injured after feeling like she was "on the brink of death" after taking a COVID-19 vaccine, and connected with Robert F. Kennedy Jr. over their shared medical beliefs. She subsequently endorsed Kennedy for president in 2024, and identified herself as "aligning with MAGA" after Kennedy aligned with President Donald Trump, despite not liking Trump's approach to war.

== Discography ==
- Feline Resurrection (2016)
- I Say Yes (2017)

== Filmography ==
=== Film ===
Year	Title	Role
2001	Bully	Emma
2003	From Justin to Kelly	Nadine
2015	Single in South Beach	Herself

=== Television ===
Year	Title	Role	Notes
2002–2003	Ocean Ave.	Jody Starr / Abby	Main role; 159 episodes
2008	Pussycat Dolls Present: Girlicious	Herself	8 episodes
2012	America's Next Top Model	Guest Judge	Episode: "Jessica Sutta"

=== Music videos ===
Year	Title	Artist
1998	"Miami"	Will Smith
1998	"Don't Let This Moment End"	Gloria Estefan
2003	"Suga Suga"	Baby Bash
2003	"Spanish"	Craig David
2004	"Don't Cry for Pain"	Ana Johnsson

== Awards and nominations ==
Ceremony	Year	Award	Work	Result	Ref.
Grammy Awards	2007	Best Pop Performance by a Duo or Group with Vocals	"Stickwitu"	Nominated	
