= List of songs recorded by Ed Sheeran =

Songs by English singer-songwriter

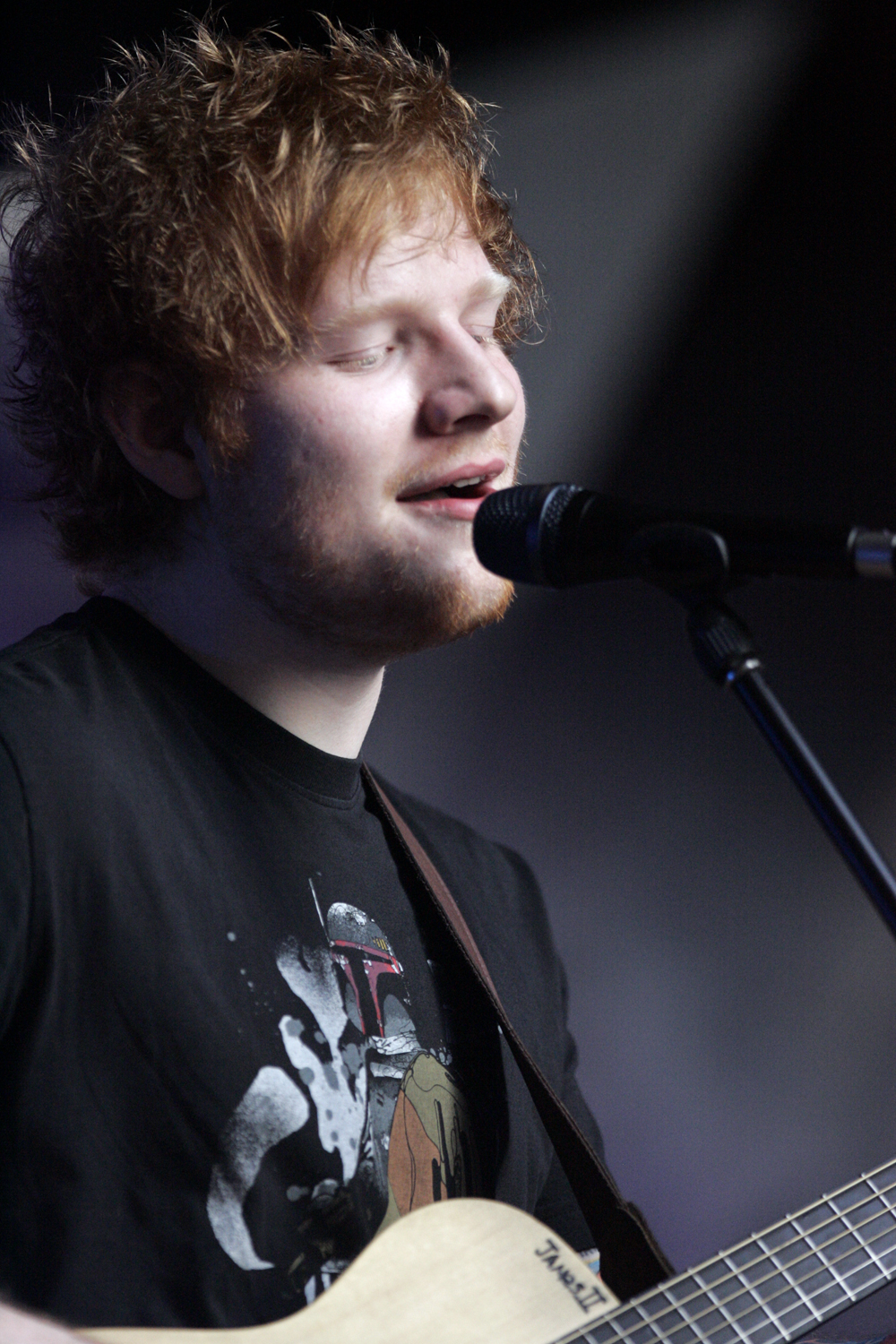
Sheeran performing in 2013 for the + tour

English singer-songwriter Ed Sheeran has recorded songs for eight studio albums and 17 EPs.

== Songs ==
Key
‡	Indicates songs written solely by Ed Sheeran

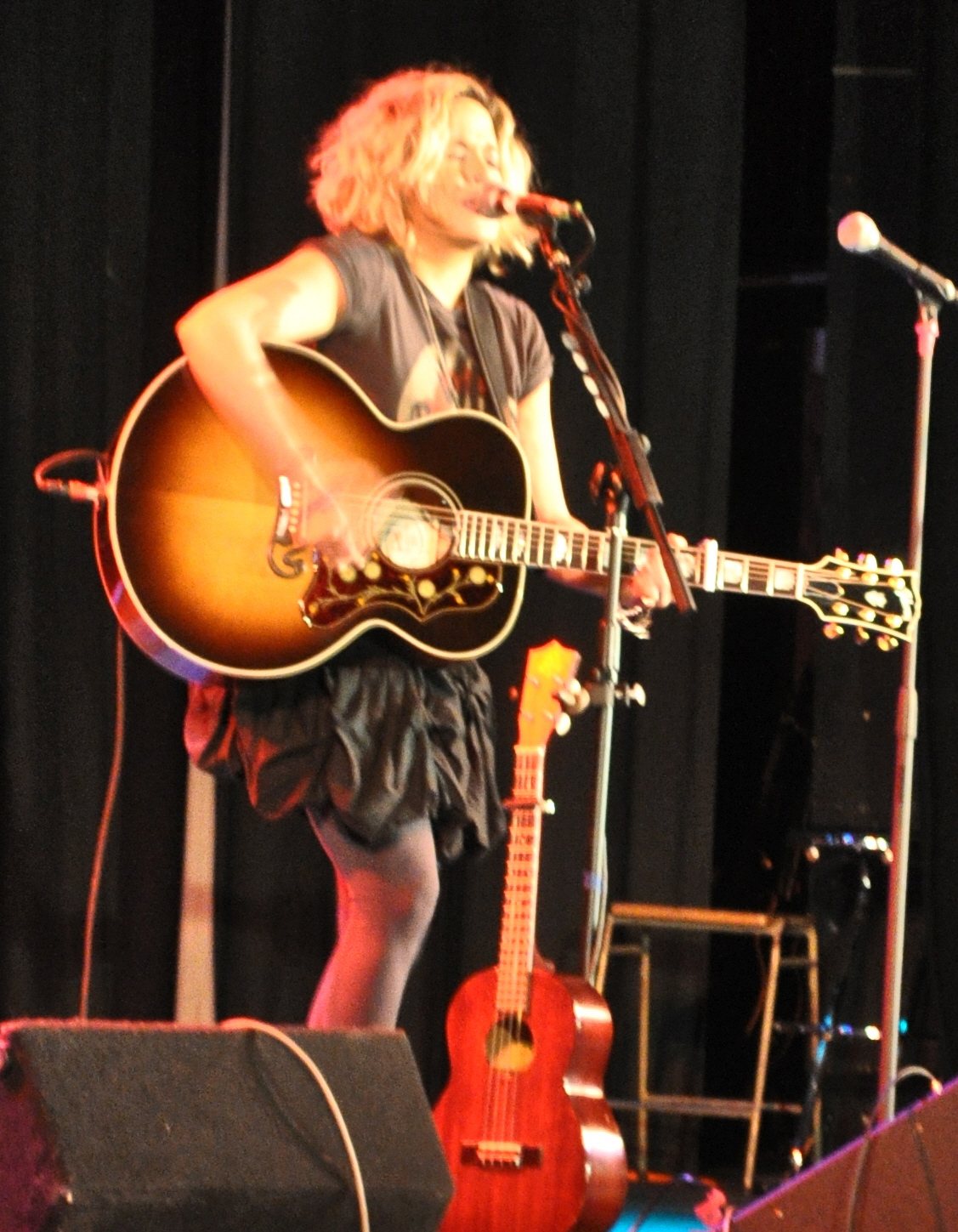
Amy Wadge has co-written 13 songs with Sheeran, five of which are included on the EP Songs I Wrote with Amy.

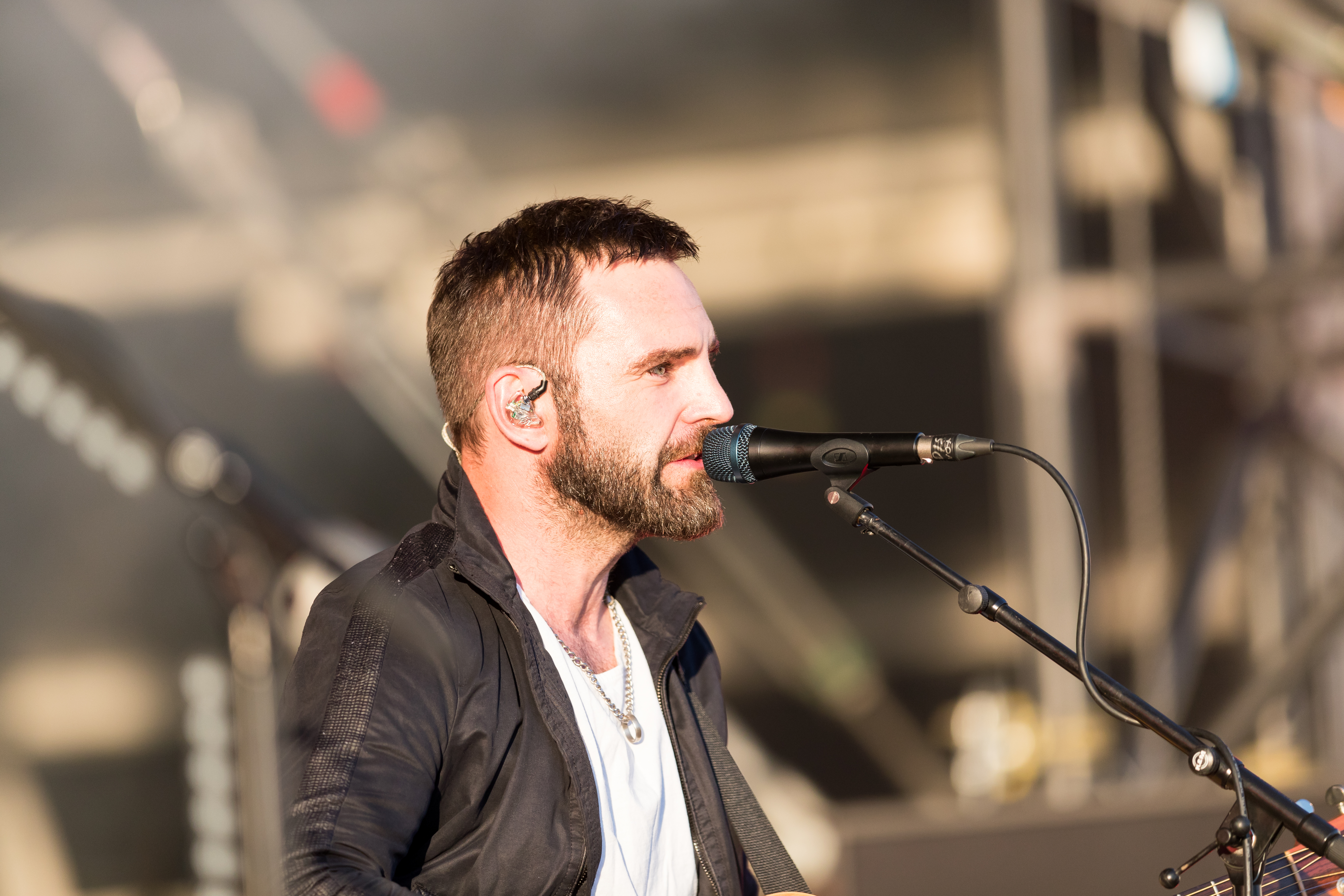
Johnny McDaid has co-written 26 songs with Sheeran for x, ÷ and =.

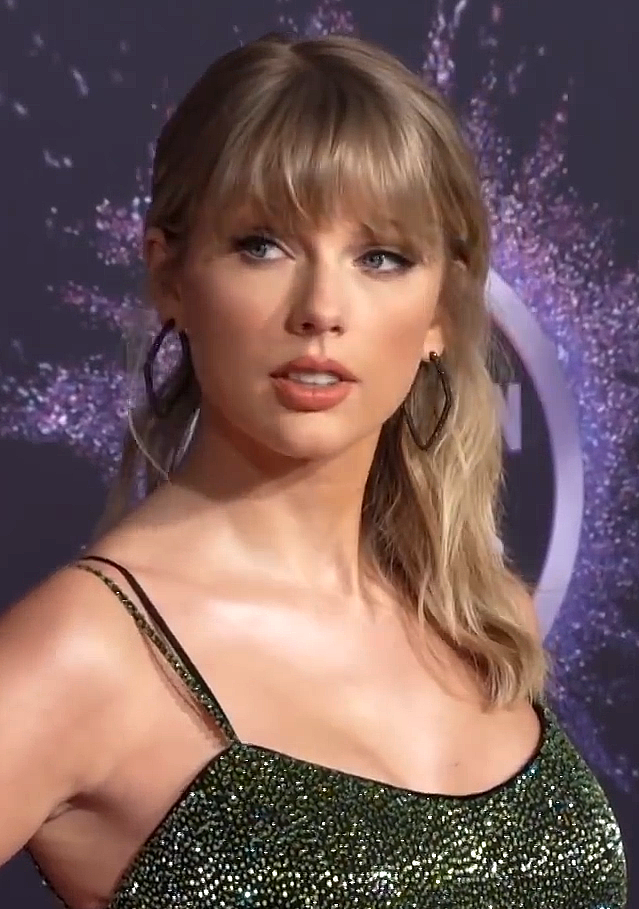
Sheeran has co-written and performed four songs with Taylor Swift (pictured).

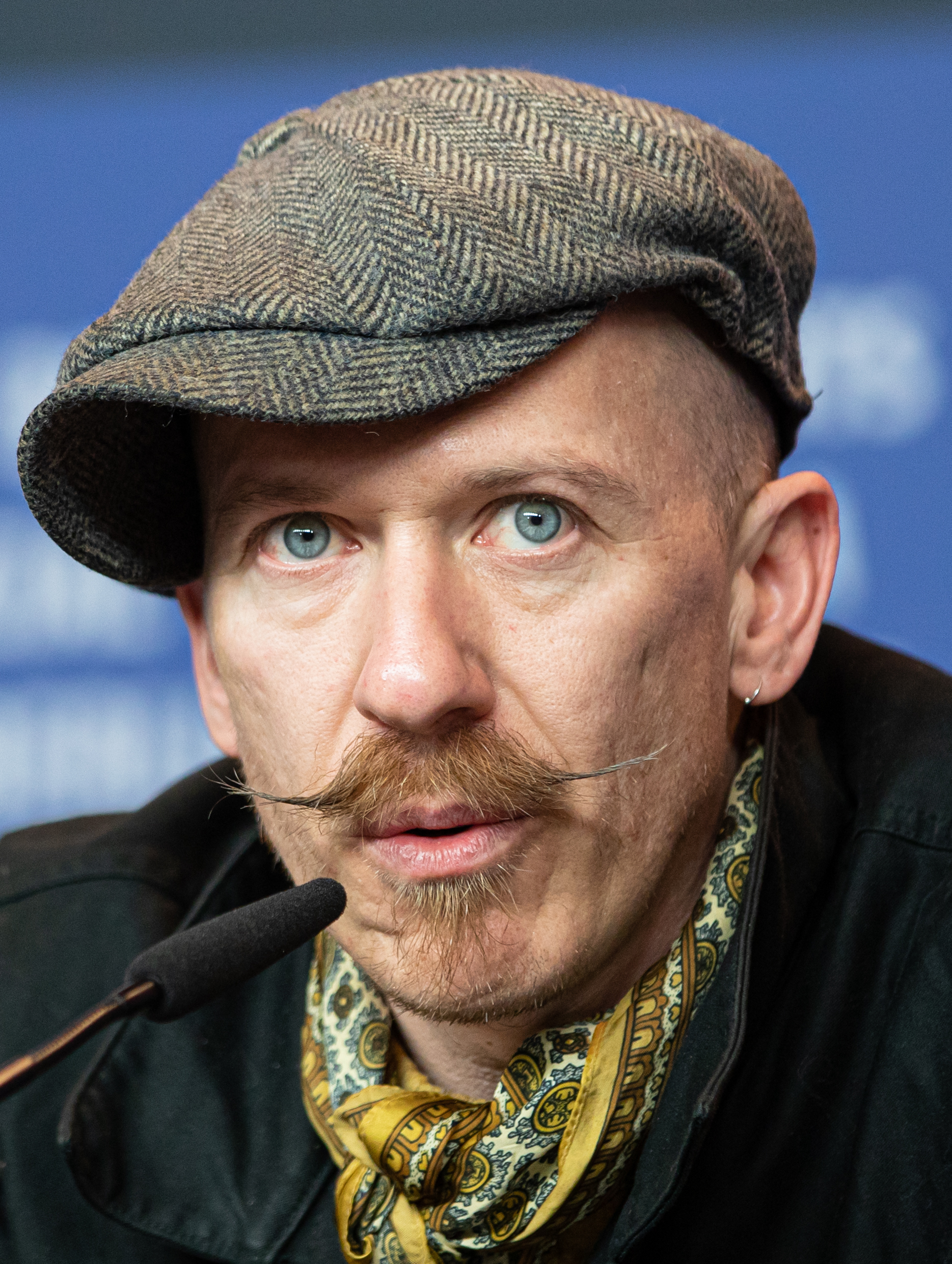
Foy Vance has co-written 9 songs with Sheeran for x, ÷ and -.

Name of song, featured performers, writers, originating album, and year released.
Song	Artist(s)	Writer(s)	Album	Year	Ref.
"2step"	Ed Sheeran	Ed Sheeran; Andrew Wotman; David Hodges; Louis Bell	=	2021	
"Addicted"	Ed Sheeran	Ed Sheeran ‡	The Orange Room	2005	
"Afire Love"	Ed Sheeran	Ed Sheeran; Johnny McDaid; Foy Vance	x	2014	
"Afterglow"	Ed Sheeran	Ed Sheeran; David Hodges; Fred Gibson	Non-album single	2020	
"All About It"	Hoodie Allen featuring Ed Sheeran	Ed Sheeran; Parrish Warrington; RJ Ferguson; Steven Markowitz	People Keep Talking	2014	
"All of the Stars"	Ed Sheeran	Ed Sheeran; Johnny McDaid	The Fault in Our Stars (Music from the Motion Picture) and x Deluxe physical edition	2014	
"Amo Soltanto Te / This Is the Only Time"	Andrea Bocelli featuring Ed Sheeran	Ed Sheeran; Matthew Sheeran; Tiziano Ferro	Sì	2019	
"Antisocial"	Ed Sheeran with Travis Scott	Ed Sheeran; Jacques Webster; Fred Gibson; Joseph Saddler	No.6 Collaborations Project	2019	
"Are You Entertained"	Russ featuring Ed Sheeran	Ed Sheeran; Fred Gibson; Russell Vitale	Non-album single	2022	
"The A Team"	Ed Sheeran	Ed Sheeran ‡	+	2011	
"Autumn Leaves"	Ed Sheeran	Ed Sheeran; Jake Gosling	+ Deluxe Version	2011	
"Azizam"					
"Bad Habits"	Ed Sheeran	Ed Sheeran; Johnny McDaid; Fred Gibson	=	2021	
"Balance"	Ed Sheeran	Ed Sheeran; Aaron Dessner	-	2023	
"Barcelona"	Ed Sheeran	Ed Sheeran; Amy Wadge; Benny Blanco; Foy Vance; Johnny McDaid	÷ Deluxe Edition	2017	
"Be Like You"	Ed Sheeran	Ed Sheeran ‡	You Need Me	2009	
"Be My Forever"	Christina Perri featuring Ed Sheeran	Christina Perri; Jamie Scott	Head or Heart	2014	
"Be Right Now"	Ed Sheeran	Ed Sheeran; Fred Gibson; Johnny McDaid	=	2021	
"Beautiful People"	Ed Sheeran featuring Khalid	Ed Sheeran; Fred Gibson; Max Martin; Shellback; Khalid Robinson	No.6 Collaborations Project	2019	
"Best Part of Me"	Ed Sheeran featuring Yebba	Ed Sheeran; Abbey Smith; Benjamin Levin	No.6 Collaborations Project	2019	
"Beyond the Pale"	Ed Sheeran	Ed Sheeran ‡	Ed Sheeran	2006	
"Bibia Be Ye Ye"	Ed Sheeran	Ed Sheeran; Benny Blanco; Fuse ODG; KillBeatz; Stephen Woode	÷ Deluxe Edition	2017	
"Billy Ruskin"	Ed Sheeran	Ed Sheeran ‡	Ed Sheeran	2006	
"Bloodstream"	Ed Sheeran	Ed Sheeran; Johnny McDaid; Gary Lightbody; Rudimental	x	2014	
"Blow"	Ed Sheeran, Chris Stapleton and Bruno Mars	Ed Sheeran; Christopher Stapleton; Peter Hernandez; Brody Brown; Frank Rogers; J.T. Cure; Bard McNamee; Greg McKee	No.6 Collaborations Project	2019	
"Boa Me"	Fuse ODG featuring Ed Sheeran and Mugeez	Nana Richard Abiona; Joseph Addison; Rashid Mugeez; Ed Sheeran	New Africa Nation	2017	
"Boat"	Ed Sheeran	Ed Sheeran; Aaron Dessner	-	2023	
"Boat (Reprise)"	Ed Sheeran	Ed Sheeran; Aaron Dessner	-	2023	
"Borderline"	Ed Sheeran	Ed Sheeran; Aaron Dessner	-	2023	
"Candle in the Wind" (cover)	Ed Sheeran	Bernie Taupin	Revamp: Reimagining the Songs of Elton John & Bernie Taupin	2018	
"Castle on the Hill"	Ed Sheeran	Ed Sheeran; Benny Blanco	÷	2017	
"The City"	Ed Sheeran	Ed Sheeran; Jake Gosling	+	2011	
"Cold Coffee"	Ed Sheeran	Ed Sheeran; Amy Wadge	Songs I Wrote with Amy	2010	
"Collide"	Ed Sheeran	Ed Sheeran; Ben Kweller; Fred Gibson; Johnny McDaid	=	2021	
"Colourblind"	Ed Sheeran	Ed Sheeran ‡	-	2023	
"Cross Me"	Ed Sheeran featuring Chance the Rapper and PnB Rock	Ed Sheeran; Chancelor Bennett; Rakim Allen; Fred Gibson	No.6 Collaborations Project	2019	
"Curtains"	Ed Sheeran	Ed Sheeran; Aaron Dessner	-	2023	
"Dark Times"	The Weeknd featuring Ed Sheeran	Abel Tesfaye; Jason Quenneville; Ed Sheeran	Beauty Behind the Madness	2015	
"Dive"	Ed Sheeran	Ed Sheeran; Benny Blanco; Julia Michaels	÷	2017	
"Don't"	Ed Sheeran	Ed Sheeran; Benny Blanco	x	2014	
"Drown Me Out"	Ed Sheeran featuring Ghetts	Ed Sheeran; Jake Gosling; Justin Clarke	No.5 Collaborations Project	2011	
"Drunk"	Ed Sheeran	Ed Sheeran; Jake Gosling	+	2011	
"Dusty"	Ed Sheeran	Ed Sheeran; Aaron Dessner	-	2023	
"End Game"	Taylor Swift featuring Ed Sheeran and Future	Taylor Swift; Max Martin; Shellback; Ed Sheeran; Nayvadius Wilburn	Reputation	2017	
"End of Youth"	Ed Sheeran	Ed Sheeran ‡	-	2023	
"English Rose"	Ed Sheeran	Ed Sheeran; Johnny McDaid	x Wembley Edition	2015	
"Eraser"	Ed Sheeran	Ed Sheeran; Johnny McDaid	÷	2017	
"Even My Dad Does Sometimes"	Ed Sheeran	Ed Sheeran; Amy Wadge	x Deluxe edition	2014	
"Everything Has Changed"	Taylor Swift featuring Ed Sheeran	Taylor Swift; Ed Sheeran	Red and Red (Taylor's Version)	2013 and 2021	
"Everything You Are"	Ed Sheeran	Ed Sheeran ‡	x French collector edition	2014	
"Eyes Closed"	Ed Sheeran	Ed Sheeran; Max Martin; Shellback; Fred Gibson	-	2023	
"Faces"	Ed Sheeran	Ed Sheeran; Jake Gosling; Michael Atha	The Slumdon Bridge	2012	
"Fall"	Ed Sheeran	Ed Sheeran; Amy Wadge	Songs I Wrote with Amy	2010	
"Family"	Ed Sheeran featuring P Money	Ed Sheeran; Jake Gosling; P Money	No.5 Collaborations Project	2011	
"Fear"	Ed Sheeran	Ed Sheeran; Aaron Dessner	-	2023	
"Feels"	Ed Sheeran featuring Young Thug and J Hus	Ed Sheeran; Jeffery Williams; Momodou Jallow; Fred Gibson	No.6 Collaborations Project	2019	
"Fire Alarms"	Ed Sheeran	Ed Sheeran; Amy Wadge	Songs I Wrote with Amy	2010	
"Firefly"	Ed Sheeran	Ed Sheeran ‡	Loose Change	2010	
"First Times"	Ed Sheeran	Ed Sheeran; David Hodges; Fred Gibson	=	2021	
"Friends"	Ed Sheeran	Ed Sheeran ‡	x French collector edition	2014	
"Galway Girl"	Ed Sheeran	Ed Sheeran; Amy Wadge; Damian McKee; Eamon Murray; Foy Vance; Johnny McDaid; Liam Bradley; Niamh Dunne; Seán Óg Graham	÷	2017	
"Get Over It"	Ed Sheeran	Ed Sheeran; Aaron Dessner	-	2023	
"Give Me Love"	Ed Sheeran	Ed Sheeran; Jake Gosling; Chris Leonard	+	2011	
"Gold Rush"	Ed Sheeran	Ed Sheeran; Amy Wadge	+ Deluxe edition	2011	
"Goodbye to You"	Ed Sheeran featuring Dot Rotten	Ed Sheeran; Jake Gosling; Zeph Ellis	No.5 Collaborations Project	2011	
"Grade 8"	Ed Sheeran	Ed Sheeran; Robert Conlon; Sukhdeep Uppall	+	2011	
"Happier"	Ed Sheeran	Ed Sheeran; Benny Blanco; Ryan Tedder	÷	2017	
"Hearts Don't Break Around Here"	Ed Sheeran	Ed Sheeran; Johnny McDaid	÷	2017	
"The Hills of Aberfeldy"	Ed Sheeran	Ed Sheeran; Foy Vance	-	2023	
"Homeless"	Ed Sheeran	Ed Sheeran; Anna Krantz	Loose Change	2010	
"How Would You Feel (Paean)"	Ed Sheeran	Ed Sheeran ‡	÷	2017	
"Hush Little Baby"	Wretch 32 featuring Ed Sheeran	Jermaine Scott; Ed Sheeran; Iain James; Tom Barnes; Pete Kelleher; Ben Kohn	Black and White	2011	
"I Can't Spell"	Ed Sheeran	Ed Sheeran ‡	Want Some?	2007	
"I Don't Care"	Ed Sheeran and Justin Bieber	Ed Sheeran; Justin Bieber; Jason Boyd; Fred Gibson; Max Martin; Shellback	No.6 Collaborations Project	2019	
"I Don't Want Your Money"	Ed Sheeran featuring H.E.R.	Ed Sheeran; Paul Jefferies; Joe Reeves; Fred Gibson	No.6 Collaborations Project	2019	
"I Love You"	Ed Sheeran	Ed Sheeran ‡	The Orange Room	2005	
"I See Fire"	Ed Sheeran	Ed Sheeran ‡	x Deluxe edition	2014	
"I Was Made for Loving You"	Tori Kelly featuring Ed Sheeran	Tori Kelly; Ed Sheeran	Unbreakable Smile	2015	
"If I Could"	Wiley featuring Ed Sheeran	Richard Cowie; Ed Sheeran	Chill Out Zone	2011	
"I'm a Mess"	Ed Sheeran	Ed Sheeran ‡	x	2014	
"I'm Glad I'm Not You"	Ed Sheeran	Ed Sheeran ‡	Want Some?	2007	
"In Memory"	Ed Sheeran	Ed Sheeran ‡	Ed Sheeran	2006	
"Insomniac's Lullaby"	Ed Sheeran	Ed Sheeran ‡	Ed Sheeran	2006	
"The Joker and the Queen"	Ed Sheeran	Ed Sheeran; Fred Gibson; Johnny McDaid; Sam Roman	=	2021	
"Kiss Me"	Ed Sheeran	Ed Sheeran; Justin Franks; Julie Frost	+	2011	
"Lately"	Ed Sheeran featuring Devlin	Ed Sheeran; Jake Gosling; Jake Devlin	No.5 Collaborations Project	2011	
"Lay It All on Me"	Rudimental featuring Ed Sheeran	Amir Izadkah; Piers Aggett; Kesi Dryden; James Newman; Ed Sheeran; Gavin Slate; Leon Rolle; Adam Eaglefield; Lasse Petersen; Maxwell McElligott; Jonny Harris; Jacob Manson; James Luke Wood	We the Generation	2015	
"Leave Your Life"	Ed Sheeran	Ed Sheeran ‡	=	2021	
"Lego House"	Ed Sheeran	Ed Sheeran; Jake Gosling; Chris Leonard	+	2011	
"Let It Out"	Ed Sheeran	Ed Sheeran ‡	Loose Change	2010	
"Life Goes On"	Ed Sheeran	Ed Sheeran ‡	-	2023	
"Little Bird"	Ed Sheeran	Ed Sheeran ‡	Loose Change	2010	
"Little Lady"	Ed Sheeran featuring Mikill Pane	Ed Sheeran; Mikill Pane	No.5 Collaborations Project	2011	
"London Bridge"	Ed Sheeran	Ed Sheeran; Jake Gosling; Michael Atha	The Slumdon Bridge	2012	
"Love in Slow Motion"	Ed Sheeran	Ed Sheeran; Johnny McDaid; Natalie Hemby	=	2021	
"The Man"	Ed Sheeran	Ed Sheeran ‡	x	2014	
"Misery"	Ed Sheeran	Ed Sheeran ‡	The Orange Room	2005	
"Moody Ballad of Ed"	Ed Sheeran	Ed Sheeran ‡	The Orange Room	2005	
"Move On"	Ed Sheeran featuring Alonestar	Ed Sheeran; Alonestar	Want Some?	2007	
"Moving"	Ed Sheeran	Ed Sheeran; Aaron Dessner	-	2023	
"Nancy Mulligan"	Ed Sheeran	Ed Sheeran; Amy Wadge; Benny Blanco; Foy Vance; Johnny McDaid; Murray Cummings	÷ Deluxe Edition	2017	
"New Man"	Ed Sheeran	Ed Sheeran; Ammar Malik; Benny Blanco; Jessie Ware	÷	2017	
"New York"	Ed Sheeran	Ed Sheeran; Emile Haynie	x	2014	
"Nightmares"	Ed Sheeran featuring Random Impulse, Sway and Wretch 32	Ed Sheeran; Jake Gosling; Random Impulse; Derek Safo; Jermaine Scott	No.5 Collaborations Project	2011	
"Nina"	Ed Sheeran	Ed Sheeran; Johnny McDaid	x	2014	
"No Luck"	Ed Sheeran	Ed Sheeran ‡	Ed Sheeran	2006	
"No Strings"	Ed Sheeran	Ed Sheeran; Aaron Dessner	-	2023	
"Nothing on You"	Ed Sheeran featuring Paulo Londra and Dave	Ed Sheeran; Paulo Londra; David Omoregie; Fred Gibson; Daniel Oviedo; Cristian Salazar	No.6 Collaborations Project	2019	
"Old School Love"	Lupe Fiasco featuring Ed Sheeran	Wasalu Jaco; Ed Sheeran; Justin Franks	Non-album single	2013	
"One"	Ed Sheeran	Ed Sheeran ‡	x	2014	
"One Night"	Ed Sheeran	Ed Sheeran ‡	Loose Change	2010	
"Open Your Ears"	Ed Sheeran	Ed Sheeran ‡	Ed Sheeran	2006	
"Ours"	Ed Sheeran	Ed Sheeran; Aaron Dessner	-	2023	
"Overpass Graffiti"	Ed Sheeran	Ed Sheeran; Fred Gibson; Johnny McDaid	=	2021	
"Own It"	Stormzy featuring Ed Sheeran and Burna Boy	Michael Omari; Ed Sheeran; Fred Gibson; Damini Ogulu	Heavy Is the Head	2019	
"Pause"	Ed Sheeran	Ed Sheeran ‡	Ed Sheeran	2006	
"Perfect"	Ed Sheeran	Ed Sheeran ‡	÷	2017	
"Photograph"	Ed Sheeran	Ed Sheeran; Johnny McDaid; Martin Harrington; Tom Leonard	x	2014	
"Postcards"	Ed Sheeran	Ed Sheeran ‡	Want Some?	2007	
"Put It All on Me"	Ed Sheeran featuring Ella Mai	Ed Sheeran; Ella Howell; Fred Gibson	No.6 Collaborations Project	2019	
"Quiet Ballad of Ed"	Ed Sheeran	Ed Sheeran ‡	Ed Sheeran	2006	
"Radio"	Ed Sheeran featuring JME	Ed Sheeran; Jake Gosling; Jamie Adenuga	No.5 Collaborations Project	2011	
"Remember the Name"	Ed Sheeran featuring Eminem and 50 Cent	Ed Sheeran; Marshall Mathers; Curtis Jackson; Karl Sandberg; Karl Schuster; Patrick Brown; Raymon Murray; Rico Wade; André Benjamin; Antwan Patton	No.6 Collaborations Project	2019	
"Repeat It"	Martin Garrix and Ed Sheeran	Martin Garrix; Ed Sheeran; Amy Wadge	Non-album single	2026	
"Reuf"	Nekfeu featuring Ed Sheeran	Ken Samaras; Pierrick Devin; Gabriel Legeleux; Ed Sheeran	Feu	2015	
"River"	Eminem featuring Ed Sheeran	Marshall Mathers; Ed Sheeran; Emile Haynie	Revival	2017	
"Run"	Taylor Swift featuring Ed Sheeran	Taylor Swift; Ed Sheeran	Red (Taylor's Version)	2021	
"Runaway"	Ed Sheeran	Ed Sheeran; Pharrell Williams	x	2014	
"Salt Water"	Ed Sheeran	Ed Sheeran; Aaron Dessner	-	2023	
"Sandman"	Ed Sheeran	Ed Sheeran; Johnny McDaid	=	2021	
"Sara"	Ed Sheeran	Ed Sheeran ‡	Want Some?	2007	
"Save Myself"	Ed Sheeran	Ed Sheeran; Amy Wadge; Timothy McKenzie	÷ Deluxe Edition	2017	
"The Sea"	Ed Sheeran	Ed Sheeran ‡	Ed Sheeran	2006	
"Shape of You"	Ed Sheeran	Ed Sheeran; Johnny McDaid; Kandi Burruss; Kevin Briggs; Steve Mac; Tameka Cottle	÷	2017	
"She"	Ed Sheeran	Ed Sheeran; Amy Wadge	Songs I Wrote with Amy	2010	
"Shirtsleeves"	Ed Sheeran	Ed Sheeran ‡	x Deluxe edition	2014	
"Shivers"	Ed Sheeran	Ed Sheeran; Johnny McDaid; Kal Lavelle; Steve Mac	=	2021	
"Sing"	Ed Sheeran	Ed Sheeran; Pharrell Williams	x	2014	
"Small Bump"	Ed Sheeran	Ed Sheeran ‡	+	2011	
"Smile"	Ed Sheeran	Ed Sheeran ‡	Want Some?	2007	
"So"	Ed Sheeran	Ed Sheeran ‡	You Need Me	2009	
"Sofa"	Ed Sheeran	Ed Sheeran ‡	Loose Change	2010	
"South of the Border"	Ed Sheeran featuring Camila Cabello and Cardi B	Ed Sheeran; Camila Cabello; Belcalis Almanzar; Fred Gibson; Jordan Thrope; Steve Mac	No.6 Collaborations Project	2019	
"Spark"	Ed Sheeran	Ed Sheeran ‡	Ed Sheeran	2006	
"Spark"	Ed Sheeran	Ed Sheeran; Aaron Dessner	-	2023	
"Stevensong"	Ed Sheeran	Ed Sheeran ‡	Ed Sheeran	2006	
"Stoned"	Ed Sheeran	Ed Sheeran; Aaron Dessner	-	2023	
"Stop the Rain"	Ed Sheeran	Ed Sheeran ‡	=	2021	
"Sunburn"	Ed Sheeran	Ed Sheeran ‡	You Need Me	2009	
"Supermarket Flowers"	Ed Sheeran	Ed Sheeran; Benny Blanco; Johnny McDaid	÷	2017	
"Sycamore"	Ed Sheeran	Ed Sheeran; Aaron Dessner	-	2023	
"Take It Back"	Ed Sheeran	Ed Sheeran; Johnny McDaid	x Deluxe edition	2014	
"Take Me Back to London"	Ed Sheeran featuring Stormzy	Ed Sheeran; Shellback; Max Martin; Fred Gibson; Michael Omari Jr.	No.6 Collaborations Project	2019	
"Teardrop" (cover)	The Collective	Robert Del Naja; Elizabeth Fraser; Grantley Marshall; Andrew Vowles	We Are the Collective	2011	
"Tenerife Sea"	Ed Sheeran	Ed Sheeran; Johnny McDaid; Foy Vance	x	2014	
"Thinking Out Loud"	Ed Sheeran	Ed Sheeran; Amy Wadge	x	2014	
"This"	Ed Sheeran	Ed Sheeran; Gordon Mills Jr.	+	2011	
"Those Kinda Nights"	Eminem featuring Ed Sheeran	Marshall Mathers; Ed Sheeran; Fred Gibson; David Domain; Luis Resto; Adrienne Bryne	Music to Be Murdered By	2020	
"Tides"	Ed Sheeran	Ed Sheeran; Foy Vance; Johnny McDaid	=	2021	
"Tone"	Ed Sheeran	Ed Sheeran; Jake Gosling; Michael Atha	The Slumdon Bridge	2012	
"Touch and Go"	Ed Sheeran	Ed Sheeran; Foy Vance	x Wembley Edition	2014	
"Toughest"	Ed Sheeran	Ed Sheeran ‡	-	2023	
"Two Blokes and a Double Bass"	Ed Sheeran	Ed Sheeran ‡	Want Some?	2007	
"Typical Average"	Ed Sheeran	Ed Sheeran ‡	The Orange Room	2005	
"U.N.I."	Ed Sheeran	Ed Sheeran; Jake Gosling	+	2011	
"Vega"	Ed Sheeran	Ed Sheeran; Aaron Dessner	-	2023	
"Visiting Hours"	Ed Sheeran	Ed Sheeran; Johnny McDaid; Anthony Clemons, Jr. Michael Pollack; Amy Wadge; Scott Carter; Kim Lang Smith	=	2021	
"Wake Me Up"	Ed Sheeran	Ed Sheeran; Jake Gosling	+	2011	
"Watchtower"	Devlin featuring Ed Sheeran	James Devlin; Ed Sheeran; Timothy McKenzie; Bob Dylan; Jimi Hendrix	A Moving Picture	2012	
"Way Home"	Ed Sheeran	Ed Sheeran ‡	Ed Sheeran	2006	
"Way to Break My Heart"	Ed Sheeran featuring Skrillex	Ed Sheeran; Sonny Moore; Steve Mac	No.6 Collaborations Project	2019	
"Wayfarer Stranger"	Ed Sheeran	Ed Sheeran ‡	One Take	2011	
"The West Coast of Clare"	Ed Sheeran	Ed Sheeran; Andy Irvine	Want Some?	2007	
"What Do I Know?"	Ed Sheeran	Ed Sheeran; Foy Vance; Johnny McDaid	÷	2017	
"Where We Land"	Ed Sheeran	Ed Sheeran; Amy Wadge	Songs I Wrote with Amy	2010	
"Wildflowers"	Ed Sheeran	Ed Sheeran ‡	-	2023	
"Wish You Were Here" (cover)	Ed Sheeran, Richard Jones, Nick Mason, Mike Rutherford and David Arnold	David Gilmour; Roger Waters	Non-album single	2012	
"Yellow Pages"	Ed Sheeran	Ed Sheeran ‡	Want Some?	2007	
"You"	Ed Sheeran featuring Wiley	Ed Sheeran; Jake Gosling; Richard Cowie Jr.	No.5 Collaborations Project	2011	
"You Break Me"	Ed Sheeran	Ed Sheeran ‡	Want Some?	2007	
"You Don't Know (For Fuck's Sake)"	Ed Sheeran	Ed Sheeran; Jake Gosling; Michael Atha	The Slumdon Bridge	2012	
"You Need Me, I Don't Need You"	Ed Sheeran	Ed Sheeran ‡	+	2011	
"You Need to Cut Your Hair"	Ed Sheeran	Ed Sheeran ‡	Want Some?	2007	
"Young Guns"	Lewi White featuring Ed Sheeran, Yasmin, Griminal and Devlin	Lewi White; Ed Sheeran; James Devlin; Joshua Ramsey; Jake Gosling	Non-album single	2011	
