= 5 (Ed Sheeran album) =

2015 box set by Ed Sheeran

Compilation album by Ed Sheeran
- Released: 12 May 2015
- Recorded: 2009–2011
- Length: 83:23
- Labels: Gingerbread Man; Atlantic

Ed Sheeran chronology
x (2014)	5 (2015)	÷ (2017)

5 is a compilation album by English singer-songwriter Ed Sheeran. It was released on 12 May 2015 via his label Gingerbread Man Records and Atlantic Records and collects his five pre-fame independently released EPs. The collection includes You Need Me (2009), Loose Change (2010), Songs I Wrote with Amy (2010), Live at the Bedford (2010) and No. 5 Collaborations Project (2011).

== Track listing ==
Disc one: You Need Me
No.	Title	Length
1.	"You Need Me, I Don't Need You"	4:05
2.	"So"	4:28
3.	"Be Like You"	3:38
4.	"The City"	4:26
5.	"Sunburn"	4:26

Disc two: Loose Change
No.	Title	Length
1.	"Let It Out"	3:51
2.	"Homeless"	3:30
3.	"Little Bird"	3:46
4.	"Sofa"	3:19
5.	"One Night"	3:26
6.	"Firefly"	4:15
7.	"The City" (live at Sticky Studios)	5:06
8.	"Firefly" (Bravado Dubstep remix)	4:29

Disc three: Songs I Wrote with Amy
No.	Title	Length
1.	"Fall"	2:43
2.	"Fire Alarms"	2:24
3.	"Where We Land"	3:03
4.	"Cold Coffee"	4:14
5.	"She"	4:04

Disc four: Live at the Bedford
No.	Title	Length
1.	"The A Team"	5:22
2.	"Homeless"	3:45
3.	"The City"	5:07
4.	"Fall"	2:31
5.	"Wake Me Up"	5:00
6.	"You Need Me, I Don't Need You"	9:50

Disc five: No.5 Collaborations Project
No.	Title	Length
1.	"Lately" (featuring Devlin)	4:32
2.	"You" (featuring Wiley)	3:26
3.	"Family" (featuring P Money)	4:15
4.	"Radio" (featuring Jme)	3:41
5.	"Little Lady" (featuring Mikill Pane)	5:31
6.	"Drown Me Out" (featuring Ghetts)	4:24
7.	"Nightmares" (featuring Random Impulse, Sway and Wretch 32)	4:05
8.	"Goodbye to You" (featuring Dot Rotten)	5:27

== Charts ==
Chart (2015–17)	Peak position
Australian Albums (ARIA)	17
Belgian Albums (Ultratop Flanders)	180
Czech Albums (ČNS IFPI)	100
Dutch Albums (Album Top 100)	64
Spanish Albums (Promusicae)	89
US Billboard 200	30

== Certifications ==
Certifications for 5
Region	Certification	Certified units/sales
New Zealand (RMNZ)	Platinum	15,000^{‡}
^{‡} Sales+streaming figures based on certification alone.
