= Thinking Out Loud =

2014 single by Ed Sheeran

Single by Ed Sheeran

from the album ×
- B-side: "I'm a Mess" (Live from Lightship 95)
- Released: 24 September 2014
- Recorded: 4 February 2014
- Studio: Sticky (Surrey, UK)
- Genre: Blue-eyed soul; soft rock
- Length: 4:41 (album version); 3:50 (radio edit)
- Label: Asylum; Atlantic
- Songwriters: Ed Sheeran; Amy Wadge
- Producer: Jake Gosling

Ed Sheeran singles chronology
"Don't" (2014)	"Thinking Out Loud" (2014)	"All About It" (2014)

Music video
- "Thinking Out Loud" on YouTube

"Thinking Out Loud" is a song by English singer-songwriter Ed Sheeran recorded for his second studio album, × (2014). It was written by Sheeran and Amy Wadge, and produced by frequent collaborator Jake Gosling. It was released in the US on 8 August 2014 as the album's third single.

In the UK, the song spent 19 weeks within the top 40 before peaking at number one in early November 2014; it became Sheeran's second number-one single there. The single has also reached the top spot in Australia, Ireland, New Zealand, Denmark, the Netherlands, Philippines, Thailand, Slovakia and South Africa, and peaked at number two on both the US Billboard Hot 100 and the Canadian Hot 100. It was Sheeran's highest-charting single in North America until "Shape of You" topped the charts in both countries in 2017.

In June 2015, "Thinking Out Loud" became the first single to spend a full year in the UK top 40. In September 2015, it also became the seventh single to have achieved triple platinum certification in the UK during the 21st century. In October 2015, the song became the first to be streamed over 500 million times on Spotify, is also one of the most streamed songs in the UK and has been viewed more than 3.9 billion times on YouTube as of September 2025.

"Thinking Out Loud" received nominations for Grammy Award for Record of the Year, Song of the Year and Best Pop Solo Performance at the 58th Grammy Awards, winning the latter two.

== Background and writing ==
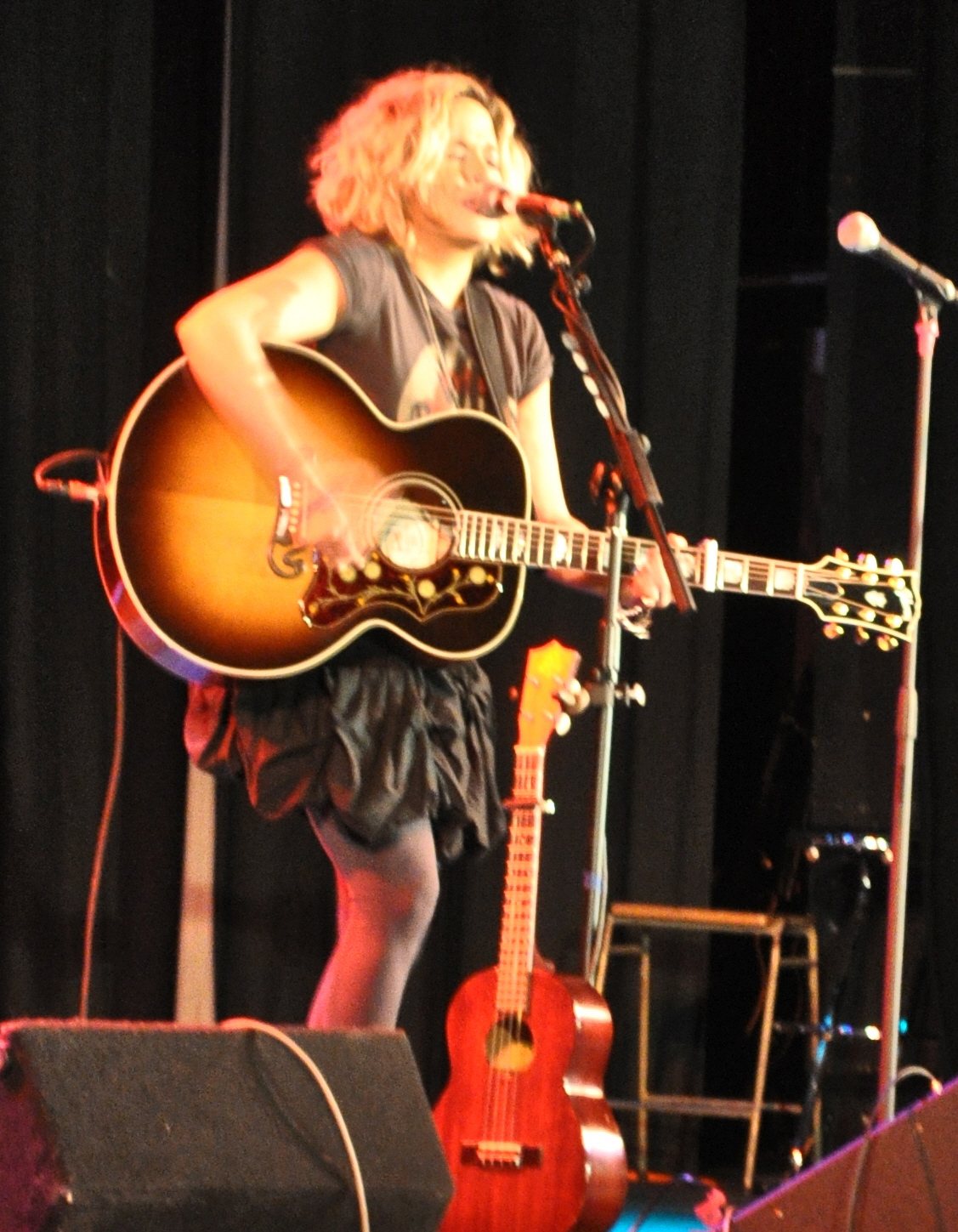
Sheeran wrote "Thinking Out Loud" with Wales-based English singer-songwriter Amy Wadge (pictured).

Sheeran wrote "Thinking Out Loud" with Amy Wadge, a Wales-based singer-songwriter. He met Wadge when he was 17 years old and they had since written several songs together. Of these, five songs composed the extended play Songs I Wrote with Amy, which Sheeran independently released on 4 April 2010. Wadge also co-wrote the song "Gold Rush", a track on the deluxe version of Sheeran's debut album, + (2011).

In February 2014, Wadge visited Sheeran at home for a "chilling-out time". Around that time, Sheeran's second studio album, ×, was nearly completed. Wadge revealed that her visit was not supposed to be a songwriting session. While Sheeran was taking a shower, Wadge played a few chords on a guitar. The tune caught the attention of Sheeran and he ran downstairs. Sheeran suggested working with the tune, but only after returning home from dinner, work began. The melody developed from a simple riff. According to Sheeran, he composed the melody on a guitar in a manner which was "very Van-like", referring to Van Morrison. The Irish musician has been an inspiration to Sheeran since a young age, and Sheeran wanted to capture that vibe when he composed the song.

In the kitchen, Sheeran and Wadge began writing the song at 2:00 am on 4 February 2014, and completed it in 20 minutes. According to Wadge, the lyrical content resulted from her and Sheeran's talking about "everlasting love", inspired by the circumstances relevant at that time. Sheeran also revealed that the lyrics were inspired by his then-girlfriend, Athina Andrelos, whom Sheeran met in early 2014. Sheeran would later explain that he wrote the song "in a relationship at a really, really happy point". Sheeran revealed that he also had his grandparents in mind and maintaining love in old age ("'til we're 70" in the lyrics), and the early version of the chorus was "I'm singing out now" before it became "I'm thinking out loud". Immediately after writing, Sheeran recorded the song on his phone. He was keen to include "Thinking Out Loud" on the second album. He properly recorded the song the following day at the Sticky Studios, a recording facility located in the small Surrey village of Windlesham, and informed Wadge of its inclusion on the album. It became the last song recorded for the album. For "Thinking Out Loud", Sheeran sought the assistance of Jake Gosling, who produced much of his debut album and had earlier contributed tracks, four of which appear on the standard version of the second album.

== Composition ==
"Thinking Out Loud" (2014)
A 28-second sample of "Thinking Out Loud", a romantic blue-eyed soul ballad.

"Thinking Out Loud" is a romantic ballad with blue-eyed soul influences. Sheeran referred to it as a "walking down the aisle song". In the lyrics, Sheeran reflects on "getting older and fidelity and love in a fairly conventional context", according to Eric Clarke, professor of music at University of Oxford.

The song was composed in the key of D major with a tempo of 79 beats per minute. Sheeran's vocals range from B_{2} to A_{4}. In the mix, Sheeran's voice is "unusually" loud over the instruments, which, for Mike Senior of the music technology magazine, Sound on Sound, is "surprisingly rare" in contemporary records. Senior analysed the vocal elements in which he found that, in spite of several notes sung off pitch, "the overall framework of the vocal remains fundamentally in tune".

Journalists noted similarities between "Thinking Out Loud" and "Let's Get It On", a 1973 single by soul musician Marvin Gaye. Andrew Unterberger of Spin wrote that "the gently loping four-note bass pattern and crisp '70s soul drums absolutely smack of the Gaye classic, as do the embrace-insistent lyrics and general candlelit-bedroom feel". Jason Lipshutz of Billboard called it a "sleek update" of the classic.

== Release ==
Prior to the album release, Sheeran debuted "Thinking Out Loud" on 24 May 2014 by performing it live on the British music television show, Later... with Jools Holland. The debut followed the release of the video accompaniment to "Sing", the album's lead single. "Thinking Out Loud" was immediately perceived as having contrast to "Sing", which is a "high-energy funk/R&B-infused song". "Thinking Out Loud" became available on 18 June 2014 as an "instant grat" download for consumers who pre-ordered × on the iTunes Store. It served as a promotional single from ×, which was released two days later. On the standard version of the album, "Thinking Out Loud" is the next-to-last track, the last being "Afire Love".

"Thinking Out Loud" was initially serviced to Australian radio on 14 August 2014 and later released on 24 September 2014. It served as the third of five singles released from the album; it followed the songs, "Sing" and "Don't", the first and second single respectively. According to Sheeran, no one from his record label wanted to release "Thinking Out Loud" as a single, favouring over "Photograph" as the "big song". "Photograph" was supposed to be the main single, but when "Thinking Out Loud" spent several weeks within the top 20 on the UK Singles Chart albeit not receiving rotation, the latter song was kept as the third single. "Photograph" was later released as the fifth and final single. "Thinking Out Loud" was issued on 7" vinyl exclusively as part of the Black Friday Record Store Day, which was celebrated on 28 November 2014. The vinyl record included, as a B-side, the live version of "I'm A Mess" which Sheeran performed at the Lightship 95 studio. On 26 December 2015, Sheeran released an Irish-language version of "Thinking Out Loud" for the Irish album CEOL 2016.

== Critical reception ==
Lauren Murphy of The Irish Times noted that the "injection of blue-eyed soul" on the song is "enjoyable", and that it "makes Sheeran's aptitude for melody difficult to dismiss". Jim Beviglia of the American Songwriter thought that although "tidy", "Thinking Out Loud" comes "toothless" compared with the "daring confessionals" Sheeran made on the other songs.

The Washington Post writer, Allison Stewart, has hailed the song as "a blatant and mercilessly effective bid for 'I'll Be'-style wedding-song immortality". Billboard magazine's Jason Lipshutz, commented that Sheeran "pushes this bold stab at romance past its sappiest moments, and ends the album on a likable note". Jamieson Cox of Time wrote that "the album's greatest moment by a country mile is relegated to its penultimate slot", referring to "Thinking Out Loud".

== Chart performance ==
"Thinking Out Loud" topped several charts in Europe, Oceania and South Africa, and reached the top ten in several other countries in North America (see Weekly charts below). Upon the album's release, the single debuted at number 26 on the UK Singles Chart. On 2 November 2014, "Thinking Out Loud" topped the UK Singles Chart in its 19th week in the Top 40, becoming Sheeran's second UK number one and breaking the record for the longest ascent to number one. In the week ending 27 June 2015, it had spent a record consecutive 52 weeks (or a full year) inside the top 40. Around the same time, the single had accumulated 1.65 million combined sales and streams; it became one of the 161 million-selling singles and the 26th best-selling of the 2010s in the UK. On 18 September 2015, the British Phonographic Industry certified the single triple platinum for combined sales (including streaming points) of 1,800,000 units.As of September 2017, the song has sold 1,219,000 copies with 130 million streams, making a total of 2,521,000 units sold in the United Kingdom. In February 2025, its certification was upgraded to octuple platinum, denoting sales and streams of over 4,800,000.In the US, "Thinking Out Loud" peaked at number two on the all-encompassing chart Billboard Hot 100; the single became Sheeran's highest-charting single until the release of "Shape of You" in 2017. It remained the runner-up spot for eight consecutive weeks, a chart feat last held in 2004. "Thinking Out Loud" was kept off the top spot by "Uptown Funk", although it outperformed the latter song for a week in February 2015 on the Billboard Digital Songs. On other specific US charts, "Thinking Out Loud" reached number one on the Billboard Adult Pop Songs for the week ending 21 February 2015, marking Sheeran's first. For the week ending 21 March 2015, "Thinking Out Loud" held the top position on the Billboard Pop Songs, Adult Pop Songs, and Adult Contemporary charts, becoming the fourth song in history to lead all three adult charts simultaneously. In celebration of Google Play's fifth anniversary, Google announced "Thinking Out Loud" as the top-selling song on the platform. "Thinking Out Loud" is Sheeran's best-selling song in the United States, with 5,622,000 copies sold as of September 2017.

=== On streaming services ===
In the UK, Sheeran's native country, "Thinking Out Loud" claimed the record for the most streams in a single week in December 2014. The track accumulated over 1,638,000 streams, and subsequently achieved a personal best of 1,850,000 streams in the week ending 21 December 2014. This record has since been broken by several songs.

In April 2015, the song ranked as the most popular based on the 2.8 million sleep-themed playlists created by Spotify users. Sleep is one of the company's most popular categories that, according to Spotify, "people also use for general relaxation and to help themselves unwind". The Guardian columnist Tim Dowling suggested that the report indicated "very popular, slightly mellow songs that keep cropping up on sleep playlists" but not a list of a "carefully curated journey to unconsciousness".

In October 2015, "Thinking Out Loud" set the record of most streams of a song on Spotify, having accumulated over 500 million streams. The company created the "Sheerio Index", an interactive graphic map which showed where Sheeran was most popular. The colour-based map indicated that Sheeran was most popular in Denmark. It was surpassed a month later by "Lean On", a song by Major Lazer and DJ Snake featuring MØ.

== Music video ==
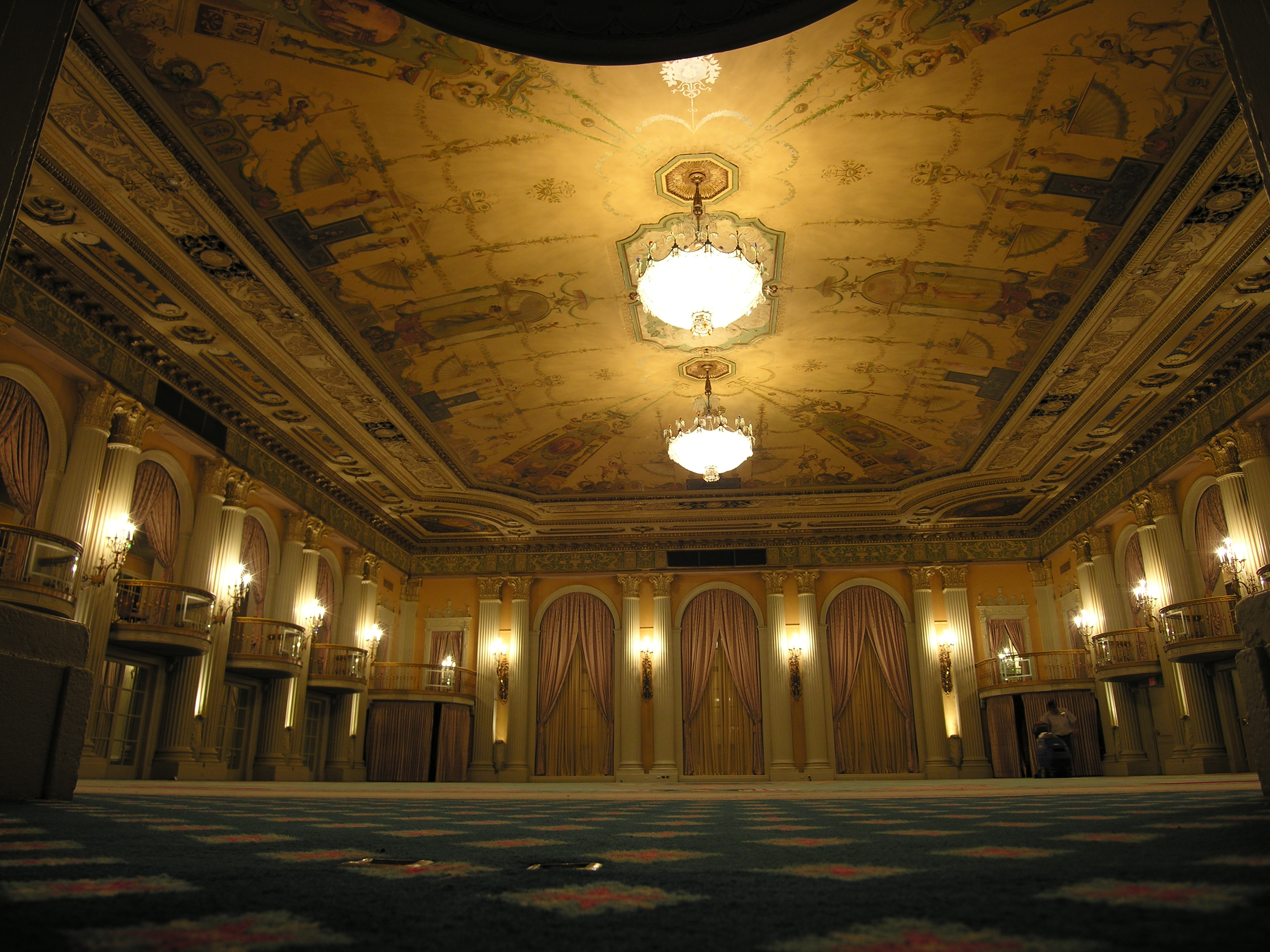
Filming of the video took place at the Crystal Ballroom of the Biltmore Hotel in Los Angeles.

Emil Nava directed the video accompaniment to the single. Most of it was filmed in the Crystal Ballroom at the Millennium Biltmore Hotel in Los Angeles, California. The video was shot continuously using a 16 mm film camera.

Unlike Sheeran's earlier videos, where he assumed a low profile, he took the lead role on "Thinking Out Loud". In the video, Sheeran executes a contemporary dance with Brittany Cherry, a contestant from the televised American dance competition, So You Think You Can Dance. The routine was choreographed by Nappytabs and with training help from Paul Karmiryan. While on concert tour, Sheeran spent five hours a day for three weeks to practice with Cherry.

The video was released on 7 October 2014. After the first 24 hours, the video had over 2.7 million views on video-sharing website, YouTube. As of September 2025, it has 3.9 billion views, making it the 28th most viewed video on the site. The music video received four nominations at the 2015 MTV Video Music Awards including Video of the Year and Best Male Video.

== Live performances ==
On 26 October 2014, Sheeran performed the song on third live results show of series 11 of The X Factor. He also performed it on 9 November 2014 in the 2014 MTV Europe Music Awards. Sheeran also performed the song as a special guest at The Voice's live finale on 16 December 2014. Furthermore, Sheeran performed the track on the Christmas Special of The Jonathan Ross Show on 20 December 2014. He also performed the song at the 57th Annual Grammy Awards on 8 February 2015 along with John Mayer, Questlove, Adam Blackstone, and Herbie Hancock. Sheeran performed "Thinking Out Loud" on 13 April 2015 results show of the second series of The X Factor in New Zealand. Sheeran also performed the song at the Victoria's Secret Fashion Show 2014. On 15 August 2024, Sheeran and Taylor Swift performed "Thinking Out Loud" at Wembley Stadium in London as part of a mashup with their collaborations "Everything Has Changed" and "End Game" for Swift's Eras Tour (2023–2024).

== Parodies and usage in media ==
On 28 April 2015 episode of The Tonight Show Starring Jimmy Fallon, actor Jeremy Renner, known for his role as Hawkeye in the Avengers movies, performed on piano and sang a song captioned by Fallon's show on YouTube as "Hawkeye Sings About His Super Powers". While not parodying Sheeran's lyrics, it is sung to the same tune. The lyrics suggest that Hawkeye feels defensive compared with the other Avengers as he was the only mortally human one in a team of superhuman or enhanced heroes: "But listen, I've got powers too; they're pretty sweet. / I promise I can do so much more than just archery... / I can open a pickle jar. / I'm friggin' Hawkeye. / Maybe I'm as super as they are."

The song and video were also parodied in the CW series Crazy Ex-Girlfriend. Titled "Let's Have Intercourse", the song was sung by Scott Michael Foster with Rachel Bloom appearing in the scene dancing with Foster in the same manner as Sheeran and Cherry. The lyrics are an appeal by Foster's character, Nathaniel Plimpton III, to series protagonist Rebecca Bunch (Bloom) to have sex whilst trapped in an elevator.

== Plagiarism allegations ==
On 10 August 2016, it was announced that the family of Ed Townsend, who co-wrote Marvin Gaye's "Let's Get It On", was suing Sheeran, alleging that "the melodic, harmonic, and rhythmic compositions of 'Thinking' are substantially and/or strikingly similar to the drum composition of 'Let's [Get It On]'." The case was dismissed without prejudice in February 2017. Two years later, on 28 June 2018, Ed Sheeran was again sued on similar grounds, this time for $100 million in damages by Structured Asset Sales, owners of one-third of the copyright to "Let's Get It On". The case was heard by a jury in New York City in 2023, which found in favor of Sheeran.

Sheeran's defence rests on the argument that, while the two songs have similar "building blocks" and a specific chord progression in particular, such features are true for many pop songs. After winning the trial, Sheeran said: "These chords are common building blocks which were used to create music long before 'Let's Get It On' was written and will be used to create music long after we are all gone."

In June 2025, the US Supreme Court refused to hear an appeal from Structured Asset Sales, thus ending the legal dispute.

== Formats and track listings ==
- 7" vinyl
  1. "Thinking Out Loud"
  2. "I'm a Mess" (Live from Lightship 95)
- CD single
  1. "Thinking Out Loud"
  2. "I'm a Mess" (Live from Lightship 95)
- Digital download (Remix)
  1. "Thinking Out Loud" (Alex Adair Remix) – 3:02
- EP (Australian Exclusive)
  1. "Thinking Out Loud"
  2. "Don't" (Sable Remix)
  3. "Sing" (Trippy Turtle Remix)
  4. "Thinking Out Loud" (Alex Adair Remix)
  5. "Don't" (X Ambassadors Remix)
  6. "Sing" (Syn Cole Remix)

== Credits and personnel ==
Credits adapted from the album liner notes:

- Ed Sheeran – vocals, writer, acoustic guitar
- Chris Leonard – electric guitar, hammond organ, bass
- Peter Gosling – piano
- Jake Gosling – producer, keyboards, programming, drums, percussion
- Mark "Spike" Stent – mixing
- Stuart Hawkes – mastering

== Charts ==
=== Weekly charts ===
Weekly chart performance
Chart (2014–2021)	Peak position
Australia (ARIA)	1
Austria (Ö3 Austria Top 40)	2
Belgium (Ultratop 50 Flanders)	6
Belgium (Ultratop 50 Wallonia)	8
Bulgaria (IFPI)	2
Canada Hot 100 (Billboard)	2
Canada AC (Billboard)	1
Canada CHR/Top 40 (Billboard)	2
Canada Hot AC (Billboard)	1
Czech Republic Airplay (ČNS IFPI)	2
Czech Republic Singles Digital (ČNS IFPI)	2
Denmark (Tracklisten)	1
Euro Digital Song Sales (Billboard)	1
Finland (Suomen virallinen lista)	8
France (SNEP)	4
Germany (GfK)	6
Global 200 (Billboard)	103
Hungary (Single Top 40)	14
Hungary (Stream Top 40)	3
Ireland (IRMA)	1
Israel International Airplay (Media Forest)	3
Italy (FIMI)	3
Japan Hot 100 (Billboard)	39
Lebanon (OLT20)	8
Mexico (Billboard Mexican Airplay)	2
Mexico Anglo (Monitor Latino)	3
Netherlands (Dutch Top 40)	1
Netherlands (Single Top 100)	1
New Zealand (Recorded Music NZ)	1
Norway (VG-lista)	4
Poland Airplay (ZPAV)	5
Romania Airplay (Media Forest)	1
Scottish Singles Sales (Official Charts)	1
Slovakia Airplay (ČNS IFPI)	1
Slovakia Singles Digital (ČNS IFPI)	1
Slovenia (SloTop50)	2
South Africa Airplay (EMA)	1
South Korea International (Gaon)	7
Spain (Promusicae)	2
Sweden (Sverigetopplistan)	2
Switzerland (Schweizer Hitparade)	3
UK Singles (Official Charts)	1
US Billboard Hot 100	2
US Adult Alternative Airplay (Billboard)	26
US Adult Contemporary (Billboard)	1
US Adult Pop Airplay (Billboard)	1
US Dance Airplay (Billboard)	7
US Latin Airplay (Billboard)	44
US Pop Airplay (Billboard)	1
US Rhythmic Airplay (Billboard)	14

=== Year-end charts ===
Year-end chart performance (2014)
Chart (2014)	Position
Australia (ARIA)	7
Denmark (Tracklisten)	29
Germany (Official German Charts)	100
Hungary (Stream Top 40)	42
Ireland (IRMA)	6
Italy (FIMI)	86
Netherlands (Dutch Top 40)	52
Netherlands (Single Top 100)	28
New Zealand (Recorded Music NZ)	7
Sweden (Sverigetopplistan)	31
UK Singles (OCC)	5

Year-end chart performance (2015)
Chart (2015)	Position
Australia (ARIA)	15
Austria (Ö3 Austria Top 40)	37
Belgium (Ultratop 50 Flanders)	25
Belgium (Ultratop 50 Wallonia)	28
Brazil (Crowley)	16
Canada (Canadian Hot 100)	2
Denmark (Tracklisten)	7
Germany (Official German Charts)	43
Hungary (Single Top 40)	69
Hungary (Stream Top 40)	26
Ireland (IRMA)	4
Israel (Media Forest)	23
Italy (FIMI)	12
Netherlands (Dutch Top 40)	24
Netherlands (Single Top 100)	6
New Zealand (Recorded Music NZ)	6
Poland (Polish Airplay Top 100)	30
Slovenia (SloTop50)	6
Spain (PROMUSICAE)	6
Sweden (Sverigetopplistan)	13
Switzerland (Schweizer Hitparade)	14
UK Singles (OCC)	12
US Billboard Hot 100	2
US Adult Contemporary (Billboard)	1
US Adult Top 40 (Billboard)	3
US Dance/Mix Show Airplay (Billboard)	43
US Mainstream Top 40 (Billboard)	10

Year-end chart performance (2016)
Chart (2016)	Position
Denmark (Tracklisten)	90
France (SNEP)	149
Netherlands (Single Top 100)	88

Year-end chart performance (2021)
Chart (2021)	Position
Global 200 (Billboard)	124

=== Decade-end charts ===
Decade-end chart performance
Chart (2010–2019)	Position
Australia (ARIA)	6
Netherlands (Single Top 100)	9
UK Singles (OCC)	3
US Billboard Hot 100	47

=== All-time charts ===
All-time chart performance
Chart	Position
Dutch Love Songs (Dutch Top 40)	31
UK Singles (OCC)	81

== Certifications ==
Certifications
Region	Certification	Certified units/sales
Australia (ARIA)	13× Platinum	910,000^{‡}
Austria (IFPI Austria)	3× Platinum	90,000^{*}
Belgium (BRMA)	2× Platinum	40,000^{‡}
Canada (Music Canada)	Diamond	800,000^{‡}
Denmark (IFPI Danmark)	7× Platinum	630,000^{‡}
France (SNEP)	Gold	75,000^{*}
Germany (BVMI)	3× Gold	600,000^{‡}
Italy (FIMI)	7× Platinum	350,000^{‡}
Mexico (AMPROFON)	Platinum+Gold	90,000^{*}
New Zealand (RMNZ)	12× Platinum	360,000^{‡}
Portugal (AFP)	2× Platinum	40,000^{‡}
Spain (Promusicae)	5× Platinum	300,000^{‡}
Sweden (GLF)	Platinum	40,000^{‡}
Switzerland (IFPI Switzerland)	4× Platinum	120,000^{‡}
United Kingdom (BPI)	8× Platinum	4,800,000^{‡}
United States (RIAA)	18× Platinum	18,000,000^{‡}
Streaming
Denmark (IFPI Danmark)	Gold	1,300,000^{†}
Japan (RIAJ)	Platinum	100,000,000^{†}
^{*} Sales figures based on certification alone.^{‡} Sales+streaming figures based on certification alone.^{†} Streaming-only figures based on certification alone.

== See also ==
- List of best-selling singles
- List of best-selling singles in Australia
- List of highest-certified digital singles in the United States
- List of UK Singles Chart number ones of 2014
- List of number-one singles of 2014 (Australia)
- List of number-one singles of 2014 (Ireland)
- List of number-one singles of 2015 (South Africa)
- List of Billboard Adult Contemporary number ones of 2015
- List of number-one digital songs of 2015 (U.S.)
- List of best-selling singles in Australia
