= Loose Change (EP) =

EP by Ed Sheeran
- Released: 2 July 2010
- Studio: Sticky Studios, Surrey
- Genre: Pop; rock
- Length: 32:25; 31:54 (5 re-release)
- Label: Sheeran Lock; Gingerbread Man Records (re-release)
- Producer: Jake Gosling

Ed Sheeran chronology
You Need Me (2009)	Loose Change (2010)	Songs I Wrote with Amy (2010)

Loose Change is an independently released EP by British singer-songwriter Ed Sheeran. The EP was recorded at Surrey's Sticky Studios, and produced by Jake Gosling. Initially released in 2010 before Sheeran had received worldwide critical acclaim, the EP has been re-released three times: in 2011; in 2015 as part of Sheeran's release of a collection of five of his previously released EPs (known as 5); and finally in 2016 on colored 12" vinyl. The title "Loose Change" is derived from the second verse of the album's leading track, The A Team.

The EP was the second part of what Sheeran called The Five EP Projects, all of which were funded privately by Sheeran and released independently. The initial release was deemed successful due to the opening track "The A Team" becoming a hit.

When the EP was re-released in 2015 as part of the 5 EP box-set collection, track one was changed from "The A Team" to "Let It Out", the lead single from Sheeran's previous EP. This was because "The A Team" went on to become the lead single from Sheeran's breakthrough album '+', and the "Let It Out" EP was not part of 5.

Loose Change reached number 90 on the UK Albums Chart in 2011. In 2017, upon Sheeran's release of two songs from his third album ÷, the album entered the charts in Australia, reaching number 83 on the ARIA Albums Chart.

Two songs from this EP appeared on Sheeran's 2011 debut studio album, +. The first was "The A Team", released as the lead single of the album. The second was the third track from the EP; "Little Bird". This song appeared only on the deluxe edition of the album, as Track 14 (labelled a 'Bonus track'). Two songs from the EP were also performed by Sheeran for his live 2011 EP Live at the Bedford. The A Team and Homeless were the opening songs of Sheeran's set during his performance.

== Track listing ==
Loose Change
No.	Title	Writer(s)	Length
1.	"Let It Out"	Ed Sheeran	3:51
2.	"Homeless"	Sheeran, Anna Krantz	3:33
3.	"Little Bird"	Sheeran	3:47
4.	"Sofa"	Sheeran, Krantz	3:21
5.	"One Night"	Sheeran, Jake Gosling	3:29
6.	"Firefly"	Sheeran	4:17
7.	"The City" (Live at Sticky Studios)	Sheeran, Gosling	5:09
8.	"Firefly" (Bravado Dubstep Remix)	Sheeran	4:27
Total length:			32:25

== Charts ==
Chart (2011–17)	Peak position
Australian Albums (ARIA)	83
Irish Albums (IRMA)	39
UK Albums (OCC)	90

== Certifications ==
Region	Certification	Certified units/sales
United Kingdom (BPI)	Gold	101,591

== Release history ==
Region	Date	Label	Format	Catalogue #	Ref.
United Kingdom	7 February 2010	Sheeran Lock	CD, digital download		
United Kingdom	12 December 2011	Atlantic	CD, digital download	5310501072	
Worldwide	12 May 2015	Atlantic, Gingerbread Man	CD box set, digital download	2564-60890-7	
Worldwide	26 February 2016	Atlantic, Gingerbread Man	Vinyl	0825646042463	
