= I'm a Mess (Ed Sheeran song) =

Song by Ed Sheeran

from the album ×
- A-side: "Thinking Out Loud"
- Released: 20 June 2014
- Recorded: 2014
- Studio: Sticky Studios (Windlesham, Surrey)
- Genre: Pop
- Length: 4:05
- Label: Asylum; Atlantic
- Songwriter: Ed Sheeran
- Producer: Jake Gosling

"I'm a Mess" is a song recorded by English singer-songwriter Ed Sheeran for his second studio album, x (2014). It features production from frequent collaborator Jake Gosling. It entered the UK Singles Chart at number 72 and rose to number 49 due to strong download sales.

== Writing and production ==
Following the release of his debut studio album, +, in 2011, Sheeran started writing material for his next release. Instead of rush-run and launch an album the next year, the singer decided to take time and focus on writing material that would help expand his career in the United States, like fellow British musician Adele and band Coldplay. The track together with "Thinking Out Loud" were the last songs he wrote for × and were inspired by his then-girlfriend, Athina Andrelos. On 16 July 2014, during the album unveiling in a room in RAK Studios, he noted that he wrote "I'm a Mess" while he was in the shower.

In an interview with the New Zealand Herald, he described "I'm a Mess" as him being in a bad situation after he hurt a person, "I think it's important to stay double-sided. I'm very aware I have a lot of flaws too and I think I wear them on my sleeve with this album." Talking to News.com.au, he identified the song as "fairly self-explanatory" and recalled, "'I'm a Mess' was definitely written at my lowest point. It actually turned out a lot nicer than what was going on at the time, the lyrics aren't too mental. That came at the end of a lot of things meeting. After that I was fine. Writing that song sorted everything out." Sheeran said that "I'm a Mess" is his favourite track from ×.

The production of "I'm a Mess" was done by Sheeran's regular collaborator, Jake Gosling and was recorded at his Sticky Studios in Windlesham, Surrey. Gosling together with Geoff Swan served as the song's engineers while William Hicks did the vocal editing and provided additional vocals. Mark "Spike" Stent mixed the track at Mixsuite UK whilst Stuark Hawkos mastered it at Metropolis Mastering in London. All the programming and instrumentation was provided by Sheeran, Gosling and Chris Leonard. A live version of "I'm a Mess" was released as a B-side on the 7" release of "Thinking Out Loud".

== Composition ==
"I'm a Mess" is a pop song with folk music influences and a length of four minutes and five seconds. Its instrumentation included electric guitar notes, backing vocals and a beating drum. According to Sony/ATV Music Publishing's digital sheet music for the song, "I'm a Mess" is composed in the key of C♯ minor and set in common time signature, and has a groove of 140 beats per minute. Sheeran's vocals span from the low note of B_{b3} to the high note of B_{b5}. Neil McCormick of The Daily Telegraph described "I'm a Mess" as an "edgy, rocky drama", whilst according to Jason Lipshutz of Billboard Sheeran uses his "classic folk voice and sensibility" to deliver the song's lyrics. MTV News' Emily Blake noted that the stripped-down production of the song helps the focus to be on Sheeran's voice. She further elaborated, "like most of his folk-leaning pop numbers, it's a track that makes you feel like Sheeran's singing just to you" and " when his voice comes down to a near whisper — making the whole thing that much more intimate."

According to Caitlin White of the same publication, "I'm a Mess" is a "lovelorn song" which shows a different side of Sheeran; instead of being brokenhearted, "he's the one that messed up". He is "self-reflective" and "self-critical" with one of the verses contain lyrics as, "And oh, I've only caused you pain" and the chorus features the line, "Easy baby, maybe I'm a liar". Billboard's Colin Stutz concluded, "Sheeran's intimate voice carries over simple guitar strokes as he describes a night of loneliness and longing that erupts with fiery passion."

== Credits and personnel ==
Credits adapted from the liner notes of ×.

Locations

- Recorded at Sticky Studios, Windlesham, Surrey
- Mixed at Mixsuite UK
- Mastered at Metropolis Mastering, London

Personnel

- Songwriting – Ed Sheeran
- Production – Jake Gosling
- Engineer – Jake Gosling, Geoff Swan
- Vocal editing – William Hicks
- Mixing – Mark "Spike" Stent
- Mastering engineer – Stuart Hawkos
- Programming and instrumentation – Ed Sheeran, Chris Leonard, Jake Gosling
- Additional vocals – William Hicks

== Charts ==
Chart (2014)	Peak position
Ireland (IRMA)	62
Sweden (Sverigetopplistan)	60
UK Singles (Official Charts Company)	49

== Certifications ==
Region	Certification	Certified units/sales
Canada (Music Canada)	Platinum	80,000^{‡}
Denmark (IFPI Danmark)	Platinum	90,000^{‡}
Italy (FIMI)	Gold	25,000^{‡}
New Zealand (RMNZ)	Platinum	30,000^{‡}
United Kingdom (BPI)	Platinum	600,000^{‡}
United States (RIAA)	Gold	500,000^{‡}
^{‡} Sales+streaming figures based on certification alone.
