= Save Myself =

Song by Ed Sheeran

from the album ÷
- Released: 3 March 2017
- Recorded: 2016
- Genre: R&B; soul; pop; orchestral pop
- Length: 4:07
- Label: Asylum; Atlantic
- Songwriters: Amy Wadge; Ed Sheeran; Labrinth
- Producers: Ed Sheeran; Labrinth

"Save Myself" is a song by English singer-songwriter Ed Sheeran. It was included on the deluxe edition of his third studio album ÷ (2017) and is the sixteenth and the closing track. It was written by Amy Wadge, Ed Sheeran and Labrinth with Sheeran and Labrinth handling the production. After the album's release it charted at number 19 on the UK Singles Chart, despite not being an official single.

== Critical reception ==
Celeb Mix writer Ellie Doe-Demosse stated: "And to end such a beautiful, banger of an album we end with Save Myself, which is another touching song. What we love most about Save Myself is the message that it promotes – there are days you'll be in a dark place and you'll feel like you've hit rock bottom, and on those days you still put people's happiness before your own, but there will come a time where you need to think of yourself before thinking of others, because eventually you'll feel washed up, taken advantage of, and used."

== Charts and certifications ==
=== Weekly charts ===
Chart (2017)	Peak position
Australia (ARIA)	38
Austria (Ö3 Austria Top 40)	58
Canada Hot 100 (Billboard)	58
France (SNEP)	161
Germany (GfK)	56
Ireland (IRMA)	14
Netherlands (Single Top 100)	29
New Zealand (Recorded Music NZ)	30
Scotland Singles (OCC)	38
Spain (PROMUSICAE)	91
Sweden (Sverigetopplistan)	57
UK Singles (OCC)	19
US Bubbling Under Hot 100 (Billboard)	3

=== Certifications ===
Region	Certification	Certified units/sales
Canada (Music Canada)	Platinum	80,000^{‡}
Denmark (IFPI Danmark)	Gold	45,000^{‡}
New Zealand (RMNZ)	Platinum	30,000^{‡}
United Kingdom (BPI)	Gold	400,000^{‡}
United States (RIAA)	Gold	500,000^{‡}
^{‡} Sales+streaming figures based on certification alone.
