= Amy Wadge =

Welsh singer and songwriter

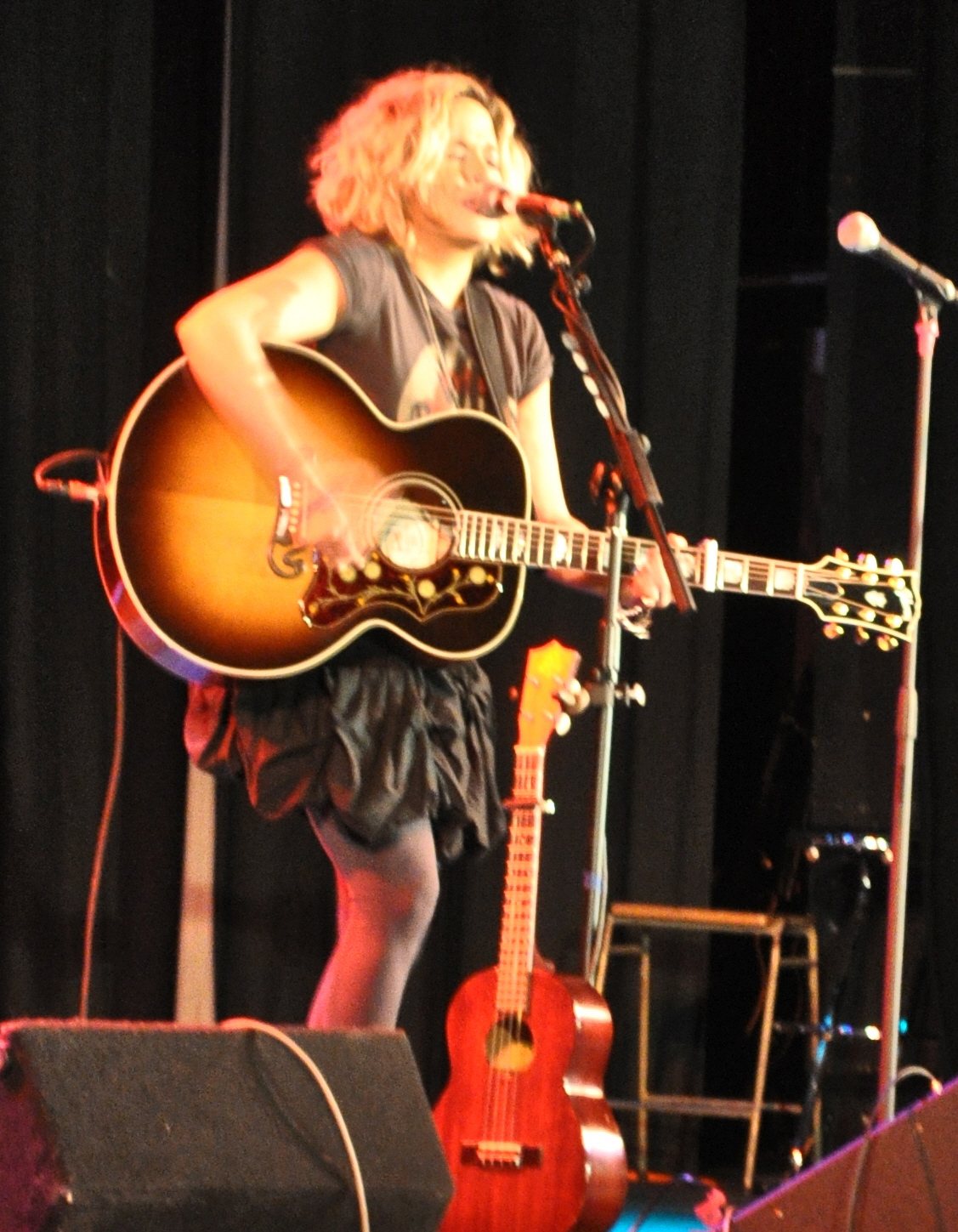
- Wadge at The Celtic Festival of Wales in 2010

Background information
- Born: Amy Victoria Wadge; 22 December 1975 (age 50)
- Origin: Backwell, England
- Genres: Rock; folk
- Occupations: Singer; songwriter
- Years active: 1992–present
- Website: amywadge.com

Amy Victoria Wadge (born 22 December 1975) is an English singer and songwriter. She has co-written tracks with Ed Sheeran, including "Thinking Out Loud" for which she won the 2016 Grammy Award for Song of the Year.

== Early life ==
Wadge was born and brought up in Backwell, a small village just outside Bristol, England. Her father's passion for music influenced her enormously, and on the subject of her paternal influences she has said that she "grew up listening to early Elton John, Joni Mitchell and James Taylor. That was the stuff I cut my teeth on and now I listen to everything you can possibly imagine from hip hop to country".

While still at school, aged 14, Wadge signed her first record deal. She released her first single at the age of 16.

== Career ==
=== Songwriting ===
Apart from writing songs for herself, Wadge has been active in collaborating with new performers in Britain, including Ed Sheeran. The two collaborated on a number of songs, and Sheeran titled his self-released 2010 EP Songs I Wrote with Amy. One track was included with the deluxe edition of Sheeran's album +. Wadge continued her collaborative relationship with Sheeran in 2014. The single "Thinking Out Loud", written on a guitar given to Sheeran, features on the album x.

Wadge has also written with Lewis Watson and has collaborated with Shannon Saunders and other artists. She wrote and performed the songs for the soundtrack of the BBC Wales series Keeping Faith in 2018, and for the second series, shown in 2019. Wadge also co-wrote "Consequences", the third single from Camila Cabello's debut album Camila.

Also in 2019, Wadge gave Bonnie Tyler three tracks ("Older" from Amy Wadge 2016, "Bad for Loving You" from Walking Disaster 2018 and "To the Moon and Back" from Recovery 2014) for the Bonnie Tyler album Between the Earth and the Stars.

In 2021, she co-wrote the song "All of My Friends" from the Delta Goodrem album Bridge Over Troubled Dreams.

In 2022, she co-wrote the UK's entry to the Eurovision Song Contest, "Space Man" by Sam Ryder.

=== Solo performer ===
Having moved to Wales and graduated from the Royal Welsh College of Music and Drama, Wadge started performing at open mic sessions in Cardiff's Toucan Club and soon started developing a fanbase and gaining critical recognition. She was quickly spotted and received encouragement from some of the big players in the city, among them Manics/Catatonia/Super Furry Animals producer Greg Haver, who recorded her debut mini-album, The Famous Hour. This album "brought her more attention and acclaim". She played alongside Stereophonics, Embrace and Lenny Kravitz at the launch party for BBC 6 Music.

In 2002, Wadge won "Best Female Solo Act" at the annual Welsh Music Awards, ahead of Charlotte Church. In 2003, she toured Australia with the Welsh Rugby Team during the Rugby World Cup with the song "Adre Nôl". Later that year, she retained her "Best Female Solo Act" at the Welsh Music Awards.

2004 saw her release her first full album, WOJ (a play on her surname, which is often mispronounced), to critical acclaim. In June 2004, she performed at London's Royal Albert Hall on a bill that included Jeff Beck and Jan Hammer, charted by Billboard magazine as one of the world's top-grossing concerts of the summer.

2006 saw the release of Wadge's second album, No Sudden Moves. The album includes a cover of the Manic Street Preachers single A Design for Life. 2008 saw the release of her third album, Bump, which (according to her own sleeve notes) was recorded over two days when she was 8 months pregnant. It includes a cover of "Don't Leave Me This Way" (originally recorded by Harold Melvin & the Blue Notes, and later covered by The Communards).

On Monday 2 November 2009, Wadge released her new single "Hold Me" with new record label, Choice Music. She also released a Welsh version of the track ("Dal Fi") which was a fundraiser for her daughter's Ysgol Feithrin (Welsh nursery school), with 20p from the sale of every Welsh language download being donated to Mudiad Meithrin, a Welsh language nursery organisation.

In 2010 and 2011, Wadge and Pete Riley released a CD (Rivers Apart), as well as two live DVDs, and toured extensively together. Her single "USA? We'll Wait and See" was released in both English and Welsh.

== Personal life ==
Wadge is married to actor Alun ap Brinley. They live near Pontypridd, in Wales.

== Songwriting credits ==
Title	Year	Album	Artist	Written with
"She"	2011	Songs I Wrote with Amy	Ed Sheeran	Ed Sheeran
"Where We Land"	2011	Songs I Wrote with Amy	Ed Sheeran	Ed Sheeran
"Fire Alarms"	2011	Songs I Wrote with Amy	Ed Sheeran	Ed Sheeran
"Fall"	2011	Songs I Wrote with Amy	Ed Sheeran	Ed Sheeran
"Cold Coffee"	2011	Songs I Wrote with Amy	Ed Sheeran	Ed Sheeran
"The A Team"	2011	+	Ed Sheeran	Ed Sheeran
"Gold Rush"	2011	+	Ed Sheeran	Ed Sheeran
"Once Before"	2012	Another Four Sad Songs	Lewis Watson	Lewis Watson
"Sink or Swim"	2012	Another Four Sad Songs	Lewis Watson	Lewis Watson
"Scars"	2012	Non-album single	Shannon Saunders	Shannon Saunders
"Comfortably Alone"	2014	Non-album single	Shannon Saunders	Shannon Saunders
"Bodies and Beats"	2014	Non-album single	Shannon Saunders	Shannon Saunders, Eg White
"Sink or Swim"	2014	The Morning	Lewis Watson	Lewis Watson
"Halo"	2014	The Morning	Lewis Watson	Lewis Watson
"Even My Dad Does Sometimes"	2014	X	Ed Sheeran	Ed Sheeran
"Thinking Out Loud"	2014	X	Ed Sheeran	Ed Sheeran
"Make It Back to Me"	2015	Ben Haenow	Ben Haenow	Ben Haenow
"Slamming Doors"	2015	Ben Haenow	Ben Haenow	Ben Haenow
"Let Myself Try"	2015	Adore	Jasmine Thompson	Jasmine Thompson
"Don't Let Me Let You Go"	2015	Jamie Lawson	Jamie Lawson	Jamie Lawson
"Start Again"	2016	Beautiful Lies	Birdy	Birdy
"Numb"	2016	Max Jury	Max Jury	Max Jury
"Stand in the Rain"	2016	Non-album single	Jessarae	Jessarae
"When Christmas Comes Around"	2016	Non-album single	Matt Terry	Ed Sheeran
"Broken"	2017	Only When We're Naked	Zak Abel	Zak Abel, Fred Cox
"Craving You"	2017	The Waiting Game	Una Healy	Una Healy
"All You Ever Need is Love"	2017	The Waiting Game	Una Healy	Una Healy
"Stay My Love"	2017	The Waiting Game	Una Healy	Una Healy
"2005"	2017	The Afterlove	James Blunt	James Blunt, Steve Mac
"Paradise"	2017	The Afterlove	James Blunt	James Blunt
"Barcelona"	2017	÷	Ed Sheeran	Ed Sheeran, Johnny McDaid, Foy Vance, Benjamin Levin
"Nancy Mulligan"	2017	÷	Ed Sheeran	Ed Sheeran, Johnny McDaid, Foy Vance, Benjamin Levin, Murray Cummings
"Save Myself"	2017	÷	Ed Sheeran	Ed Sheeran
"Galway Girl"	2017	÷	Ed Sheeran	Ed Sheeran, Johnny McDaid, Foy Vance, Damien McKee, Sean Grahan, Liam Bradley, Eamon Murray, Niamh Dunne
"I Don't Know"	2017	Non-album single	Molly Kate Kestner	Molly Kate Kestner
"Little By Little"	2018	Clare Bowen	Clare Bowen	Clare Bowen, Brandon Young
"Hollow Hallelujah"	2018	Southern Gothic	Tyminski	Dan Tyminski, Jesse Frasure, Sarah Buxton,
"Consequences"	2018	Camila	Camila Cabello	Camila Cabello, Emily Weisband, Nicolle Galyon
"Parallel Line"	2018	Graffiti You	Keith Urban	Keith Urban, Ed Sheeran, Johnny McDaid, Julia Michaels, Benjamin Levin
"Sincerely Yours"	2018	Golden	Kylie Minogue	Kylie Minogue, Jesse Frasure
"Rollin'"	2018	Golden	Kylie Minogue	Kylie Minogue, Sky Adams
"Radio On"	2018	Golden	Kylie Minogue	Kylie Minogue, John Green
"Every Little Part of Me"	2018	Golden	Kylie Minogue	Kylie Minogue, Sky Adams
"Wonder Woman"	2018	Golden Hour	Kacey Musgraves	Kacey Musgraves, Jesse Frasure, Hillary Lindsey
"Run in the Rain"	2018	Lighting Matches	Tom Grennan	Tom Grennan, Adj Buffone
"Because"	2018	Thank You & Goodnight	Boyzone	Ronan Keating, Ed Sheeran
"Ain't That Funny"	2018	A Northern Soul	Sheridan Smith	Sheridan Smith, Jimmy Hogarth
"Are You Just Sleeping"	2018	A Northern Soul	Sheridan Smith	Sheridan Smith, Jimmy Hogarth
"Handle With Care"	2018	A Northern Soul	Sheridan Smith	Sheridan Smith, Jimmy Hogarth
"Remedy in the Melody"	2018	A Northern Soul	Sheridan Smith	Sheridan Smith, Jimmy Hogarth
"Rock Bottom"	2018	A Northern Soul	Sheridan Smith	Sheridan Smith, Jimmy Hogarth
"Ladies in the 90's"	2018	Non-album single	Lauren Alaina	Lauren Alaina, Jesse Frasure
"If You"	2018	Story of Me	Megan McKenna	Megan McKenna
"How Many Times"	2018	Story of Me	Megan McKenna	Megan McKenna
"Story of Me"	2018	Story of Me	Megan McKenna	Megan McKenna
"Everything but You"	2018	Story of Me	Megan McKenna	Megan McKenna
"Paperboy"	2018	Story of Me	Megan McKenna	Jon Maguire, Catherine McGrath
"By Christmas Eve"	2018	A Legendary Christmas	John Legend	John Legend, Dan Lafrombe Evans
"Faith's Song"	2018	Keeping Faith – EP	Amy Wadge	
"We Fall Down"	2018	Keeping Faith – EP	Amy Wadge	
"Here I Go Again"	2018	Keeping Faith – EP	Amy Wadge	
"Pain"	2018	Keeping Faith – EP	Amy Wadge	
"Evan's Song"	2018	Keeping Faith – EP	Amy Wadge	
"Let The Light Back In"	2018	Keeping Faith – EP	Amy Wadge	
"How Long"	2018	Keeping Faith – EP	Amy Wadge	
"No Prayer"	2018	Keeping Faith – EP	Amy Wadge	
"Not Enough"	2018	Keeping Faith – EP	Amy Wadge	
"Steve's Song"	2018	Keeping Faith – EP	Amy Wadge	
"End Of It All"	2018	Keeping Faith – EP	Amy Wadge	
"The Haunting of Me"	2019	The Years In Between	Jamie Lawson	Jamie Lawson
"Not Like Us"	2019	Fire & Brimstone	Brantley Gilbert	Brantley Gilbert, Brock Berryhill, Rhett Akins
"Almost"	2019	Fire & Brimstone	Brantley Gilbert	Thomas Rhett, Ashley Gorley, Jesse Frasure
"VHS"	2019	Fire & Brimstone	Brantley Gilbert	Thomas Rhett, Ashley Gorley, Jesse Frasure
"Center Point Road"	2019	Center Point Road	Thomas Rhett	Thomas Rhett, Cleve Wilson, Jesse Frasure
"Let It Be Love"	2019	Ocean	Lady A	Hillary Scott, Jordan Reynolds
"This"	2019	Non-album single	Megan McKenna	Megan McKenna, Alex Stacey
"Monsters"	2019	Once Upon a Mind	James Blunt	James Blunt, Jimmy Hogarth
"FUNoah"	2019	Non-album single	Noah Cyrus	Noah Cyrus, Varren Wade, London Holmes
"This"	2019	Non-album single	Megan McKenna	Megan McKenna
"Blue"	2019	My Name Is Michael Holbrook	Mika	Mika
"Platform Ballerinas"	2019	My Name Is Michael Holbrook	Mika	Mika
"Dear Jealousy"	2019	My Name Is Michael Holbrook	Mika	George Moore, Mika
"Woman"	2019	The Good & The Bad	Anthony Ramos	Anthony Ramos, Jackson Morgan, Johan Carlsson, Ross Golan
"Used to This"	2019	Romance	Camila Cabello	Camila Cabello, Finneas O'Connell
"First Man"	2019	Romance	Camila Cabello	Camila Cabello, Jordan Reynolds
"Under Dog"	2020	Alicia	Alicia Keys	Alicia Keys, Ed Sheeran, Foy Vance, Johnny McDaid, Jonny Coffer
"Stop"	2020	Non-album single	Anthony Ramos	Anthony Ramos, Sean Douglas, Jesse Shatkin, Joel Castillo
"Airpods"	2020	Leave It Beautiful	Astrid S	Astrid S, Jakob Hazell, Svante Halldin
"Bad Things"	2020	no one else, not even you	Mae Muller	Mae Muller, Westen Weiss
"All of My Friends"	2021	Bridge over Troubled Dreams	Delta Goodrem	Delta Goodrem
"Visiting Hours"	2021	=	Ed Sheeran	Ed Sheeran, Johnny McDaid, Anthony Clemons, Jr., Michael Pollack, Scott Carter, Kim Lang Smith
"Lifeline"	2021	Wild Dreams	Westlife	Mark Feehily, Shane Filan
"Rewind"	2021	Wild Dreams	Westlife	Feehily, Filan, Jessica Agombar, Nicholas James Gale
"Space Man"	2022	There's Nothing but Space, Man!	Sam Ryder	Sam Ryder and Max Wolfgang
"When I Get There"	2023	Trustfall	P!nk	David Hodges
"Don't Do Me Good"	2024	Weird Faith	Madi Diaz	Madi Diaz
"Repeat It"	2026	Non-album single	Martin Garrix and Ed Sheeran	Martin Garrix, Ed Sheeran

== Discography ==
=== Albums ===
Title	Artist	Year	Credits
The Famous Hour	Amy Wadge	2002	Written & Performed
Open	Amy Wadge	2003	Written & Performed
Woj	Amy Wadge	2004	Written & Performed
No Sudden Moves	Amy Wadge	2006	Written & Performed
Tougher Than Love	Amy Wadge	2007	Co-written & Performed
Bump	Amy Wadge	2008	Written, Performed & Produced
Acoustig	Amy Wadge	2009	Written, Performed & Produced
Rivers Apart	Amy Wadge & Pete Riley	2011	Co-written & Performed
Afterglow	Amy Wadge & Pete Riley	2012	Co-written & Performed
Amy Wadge	Amy Wadge	2016	Co-written & Performed

=== EPs and singles ===
Artist	Title	Year	Credits
Amy Wadge	"Saddest Eyes"	2000	Written & performed
Amy Wadge	"Just in Time"	2003	Written & performed
Amy Wadge	"USA? Oes Angen Mwy..."	2005	Co-written & performed
Amy Wadge	"USA? We'll Wait and See..."	2005	Co-written & performed
Amy Wadge	"A Design for Life" (cover)	2006	Performed
Amy Wadge	"SXSW"	2009	Written, performed & produced
Amy Wadge	"Hold Me"	2009	Written & performed
Amy Wadge	Recovery (EP)	2014	Written, performed & produced
Amy Wadge	"No Use Crying Over Spilt Milk"	2015	Written, performed & produced
Amy Wadge	"Keeping Faith"	2018	Written, performed
Amy Wadge	"Keeping Faith" - Series 2	2019	Written, performed
Amy Wadge	"Keeping Faith" - Series 3	2021	Written, performed

=== Other charted songs ===
Year	Title	Peak position
Year	Title	UK
2019	"Faith's Song"	74

== Awards ==
Year	Awarding Body	Award
2002	Welsh Music Awards	Best Female Solo Artist
2003	Welsh Music Awards	Best Female Solo Artist
2015	The Royal Welsh College of Music and Drama	Fellowship
2016	The Recording Academy, Grammy Award	Song of the Year
2016	University of South Wales	Honorary Doctorate of Music
2016	ASCAP	Songwriter of the Year
