= Sticky Studios =

Sticky Studios is an independent music recording studio located in Windlesham, Surrey. The studio is owned by music producer, songwriter, remixer, manager and publisher Jake Gosling. Sticky Studios is most notable for its work with artists such as Ed Sheeran, Shawn Mendes, One Direction, Hilary Duff, Christina Perri, Paloma Faith and Wiley.

== Ed Sheeran ==
Ed Sheeran started coming to Sticky Studios in 2007 when he teamed up with Jake Gosling to produce the Songs I Wrote with Amy EP, The Loose Change EP and The No. 5 Collaborations Project EP which featured rappers Wiley, Devlin, Sway DaSafo, Mikill Pane, JME, Ghetts, P Money, Dot Rotten, and Wretch 32.

All of Ed Sheeran's 2011 release + was produced at Sticky Studios, bar one track. Sticky Studio was also home to the production of seven tracks on Sheeran's second album x (2014).

== One Direction ==
One Direction came to the studio in 2011 to work with studio owner, Jake Gosling, to produce the track Moments from One Direction multi-platinum selling debut album Up All Night. The album was an international success, topping the charts in 16 countries. The album debuted at number 2 on the UK album chart and became the UK's fastest selling debut album of 2011.

In 2012 One Direction returned to Sticky Studios to work on their second album titled Take Me Home. It was at Sticky Studios that Little Things, the second single from the album, was produced by Jake Gosling after being co-written by Ed Sheeran and Fiona Bevan. Over Again, from the same album, was also produced at Sticky Studios.

== Paloma Faith ==
In 2012, female solo artist Paloma Faith went to Sticky Studios to work on her UK double platinum selling album Fall to Grace, which peaked at number 2 in the UK Albums Chart. The album's lead single "Picking Up the Pieces" peaked at number 7 in the UK Singles Chart. The album became Faith's highest UK chart position to date.

== Christina Perri ==
In 2013 Christina Perri spent 6 weeks at Sticky Studios in order to create her second studio album Head or Heart, which went on to be released in March 2014 under Atlantic Records The album reached number 4 on the US Billboard 200 and number 8 on the official UK album charts. "Human", the lead single from the album, peaked at number 14 in the UK and number 31 in the USA, where it was certified as gold.

== Other projects ==
Sticky Studios has also been home to Scottish singer, songwriter Nina Nesbitt, Nesbitt went to the studio in 2012 to produce her first EP titled The Apple Tree. She then returned in 2013 to work on her debut album, Peroxide, which was released in February 2014 and peaked at number 11 in the UK Album Chart and number 1 in Nesbitt's native Scottish album chart.

Rapper Mikill Pane went to Sticky Studios in 2013 to work on his debut album Blame Miss Barclay. Alongside Irish boy band The Original Rudeboys who came to Sticky in 2012 to write with Jake Gosling and have him produce their debut album This Life, which reached number 3 in the Irish Official Music Chart and has been certified as platinum. The Original Rudeboys' returned the following year to work on their second album, All We Are, which was released in March 2014 and reached number 2 in the Irish Charts.
