= Jake Gosling =

British record producer

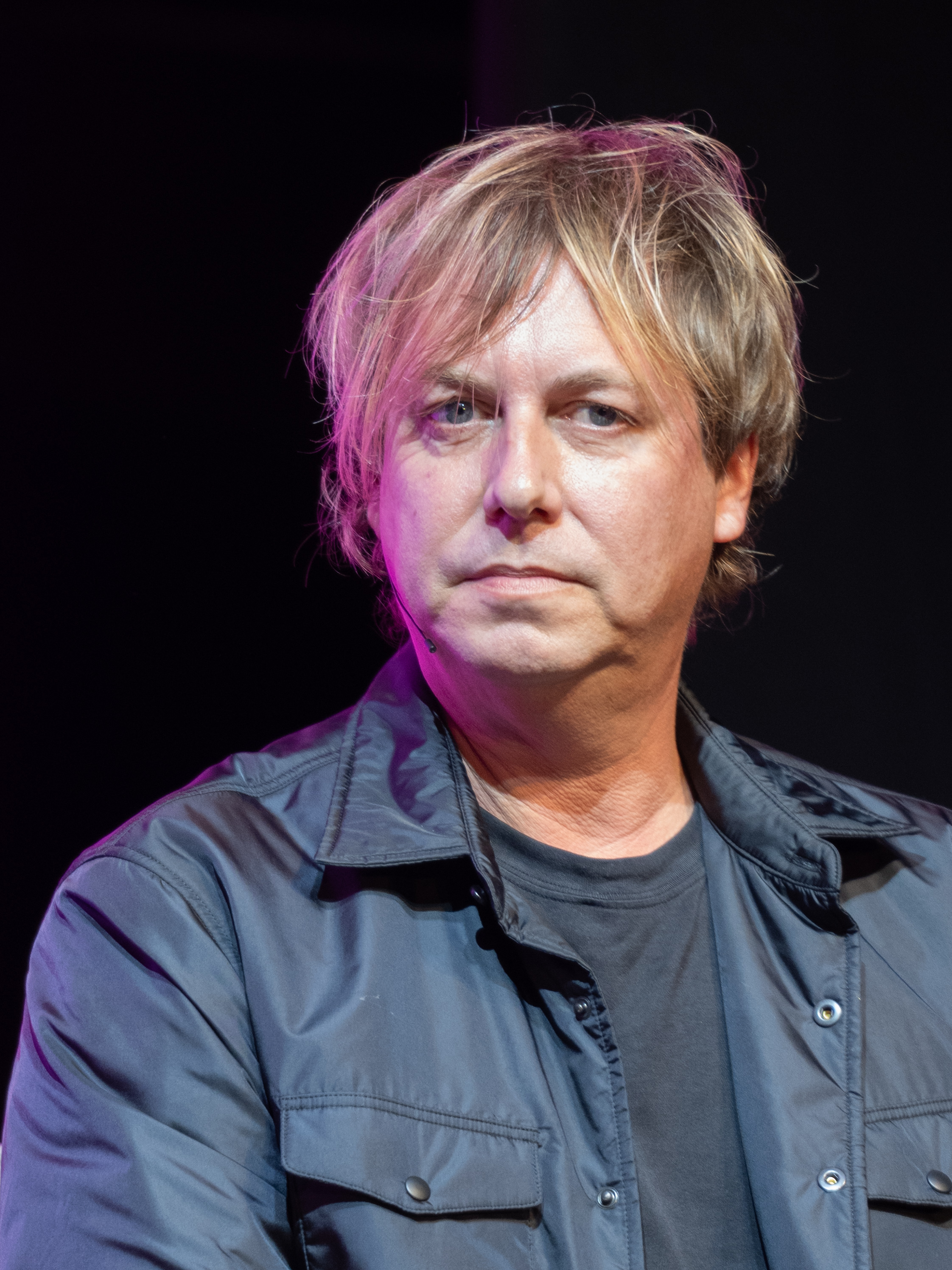
- Gosling at SXSW London in 2025

Background information
- Born: Jake Nathan Gosling
- Origin: Surrey, UK
- Genres: Pop; acoustic; hip hop; grime; dance
- Occupations: Record producer; songwriter; music publisher
- Labels: Goldun Egg; Concord
- Website: themovement.uk.com

Jake Nathan Gosling is an English record producer and songwriter. Best known for his production work for English singer Ed Sheeran, he has also been credited on releases for acts including Lady Gaga, The Libertines, James Bay, Shawn Mendes, All Time Low, One Direction, Major Lazer, Christina Perri, Shania Twain, 5 Seconds of Summer, Paloma Faith, and Wiley.

He won the 2014 ASCAP Award for his contributions to Ed Sheeran's "Lego House," and was named Music Week's Producer of 2012 following his work on its parent album, + (2011). His notable credits include Paloma Faith's Fall to Grace (2011), One Direction's Up All Night (2011) and Take Me Home (2012); the latter's single, "Little Things" peaked atop the UK singles chart. Gosling founded the Surrey-based recording studio Sticky Studios in 2002.

He was nominated for Record of the Year at the 58th Annual Grammy Awards for his work on Sheeran's 2014 single "Thinking Out Loud". Its parent album, x (2014) won the Brit Award for "Album of the Year" in 2015, and was nominated for the namesake award at the 57th Annual Grammy Awards. In June 2015, "Thinking Out Loud" became the first song to spend a full year within the UK singles chart's top 40, and by September, it became the seventh to have received triple platinum certification by the British Phonographic Industry (BPI) in the 21st century. Furthermore, "Thinking Out Loud" was the first song to reach 500 million streams on Spotify.

Gosling co-wrote the songs "Incomplete" from James Bay's album Chaos and the Calm (2015), "Missing You" from All Time Low's album Future Hearts (2015), and "Home" for Birdy from her album Fire Within (2013). He served as lead producer on the albums Illuminate (2016) and Dancing Shadows by American singers Shawn Mendes and Mario, respectively. As a lead artist, he was credited as a guest performer alongside Mr Eazi and Raye on Major Lazer's 2018 single "Tied Up".

Gosling and Sarah Liversedge co-founded the publishing company The Movement London Limited in 2013. In 2017, Gosling founded the record label Goldun Egg Records. In 2020, he signed with Concord Music Publishing as a songwriter, and was selected as a member of the Music Producers Guild.

== Goldun Egg ==
=== Goldun Egg Records ===
Gosling launched Goldun Egg Records in 2017, a record label which describes itself as a means of forwarding the creativity of its artists.

The roster includes:

- NUUXS, [pronounced Nooks] is a half Laos, half French solo pop-noir artist that who was raised in Hackney, London. Her music has been described as 'Hypnotic and intoxicating' (Nylon) and 'So polished that it emits its own ultraviolet' (The Line of Best Fit). She has headlined the Sackler Space at The Roundhouse and played Bush Hall.
- Fergus, a singer-songwriter gifted with a beautiful voice who received his first radio play on Radio X, with recent single "Willow". Clash noted that "The newcomer's work gets under your skin, overpowering your emotions. FERGUS has developed a potent, highly individual style all his own".

== Early career ==
Gosling started his music career performing as a lead vocalist and keys player in numerous bands, often engineering and producing the band's music, it was here he began to learn music production and modern recording techniques. After working in numerous jobs within the music industry, Gosling started his own recording studio; Sticky Studios, in Surrey, England. Gosling's first mainstream success came in 2008 with the album See Clear Now by UK rapper Wiley, which reached number 18 in the UK chart. The album featured tracks "summertime", produced by Gosling, and "Cash in My Pocket", which he worked on with Mark Ronson. Gosling then worked with Southern Fried Records and produced/co-wrote tracks on the Crookers album Tons of Friends. He also performed vocals alongside Pitbull and Kardinal Offishall on tracks "Natural Born Hustler" and "Put Your Hands on Me".

== Ed Sheeran ==
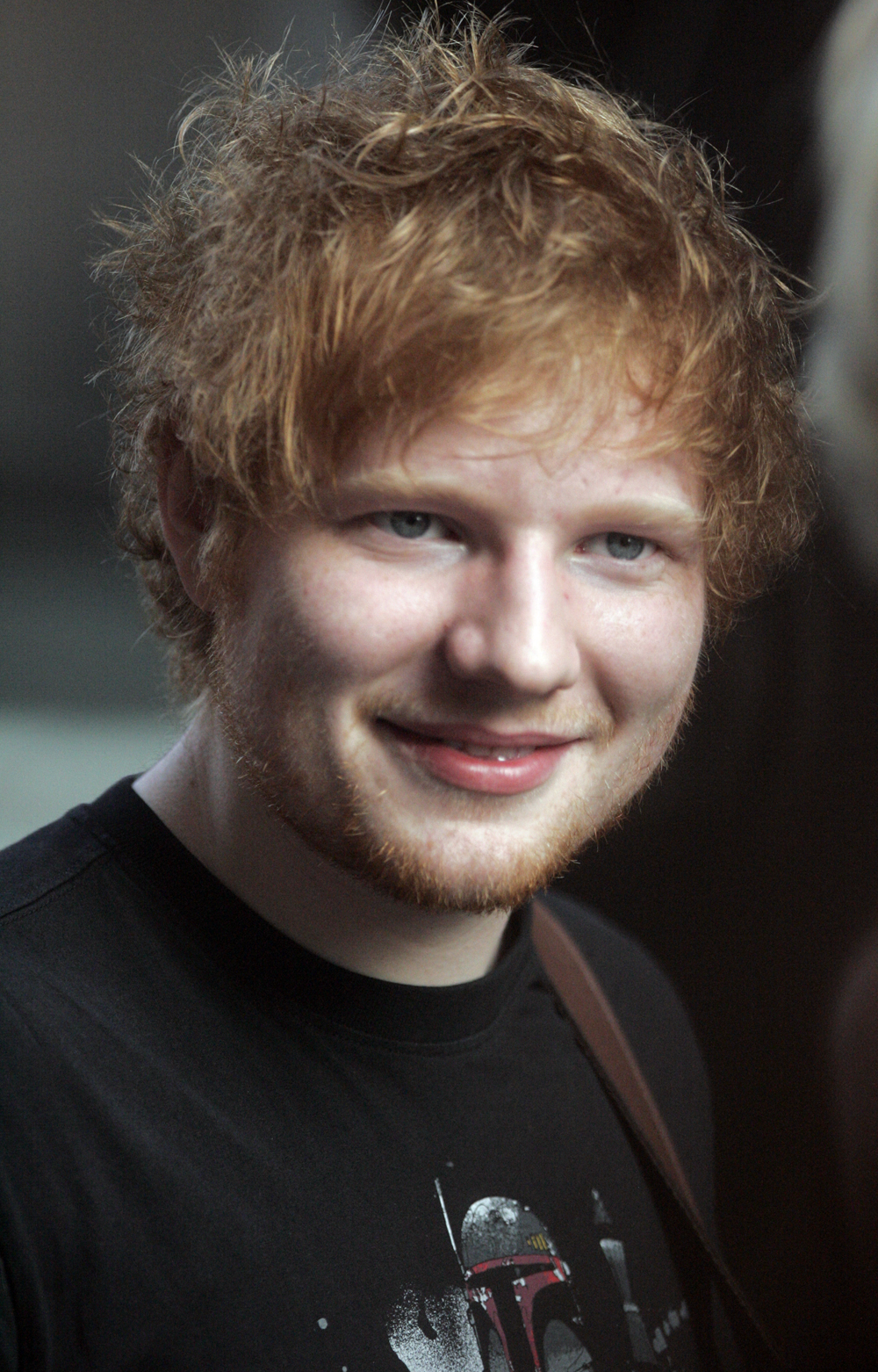
Ed Sheeran in 2013

Gosling began working with then-unknown singer Ed Sheeran in 2007, and they have since formed a successful musical partnership. In 2010, Gosling produced his Songs I Wrote with Amy EP, as well as his Loose Change EP and No. 5 Collaborations Project EP, which featured rappers Wiley, Devlin, Sway DaSafo, Mikill Pane, JME, Ghetts, P Money, Dot Rotten, and Wretch 32. In 2014, Gosling produced Sheeran's single "Make It Rain" for the television series Sons of Anarchy.

2011 saw the release of Sheeran's debut album +, for which Gosling co-wrote seven tracks and produced all but one of the tracks. + debuted atop the UK Albums Chart with first week sales of 102,000 copies; its first single, "The A Team" received a Grammy Award nomination and peaked at number three on the UK charts, while his follow-up single, "You Need Me, I Don't Need You" peaked at number four, and the third single, "Lego House" (co-written by Sheeran, Gosling, and Leonard) received quintuple platinum certification by the BPI, sold over 600,000 copies, and reached number five on chart. Its fourth single, "Drunk", also reached the top ten. By March 2014, + had been certified 6× platinum, indicating sales of over 1,800,000 records sold in the UK, as well as selling over 1,000,000 copies of single "The A Team". + peaked atop the charts in multiple countries, and number five on the US Billboard 200. The album has been received 29 gold or platinum certifications outside of the UK.

Gosling produced Sheeran and American rapper Yelawolf's collaborative EP The Slumdon Bridge (2012). Gosling produced seven tracks on Sheeran's second album x, alongside American producers Rick Rubin and Pharrell Williams, which was released in June 2014. and spent eight weeks atop the UK singles chart, and in its first week, peaked atop 12 other countries. It has also received double platinum certification by the BPI and was named the UK's biggest selling album of 2014.

== One Direction ==
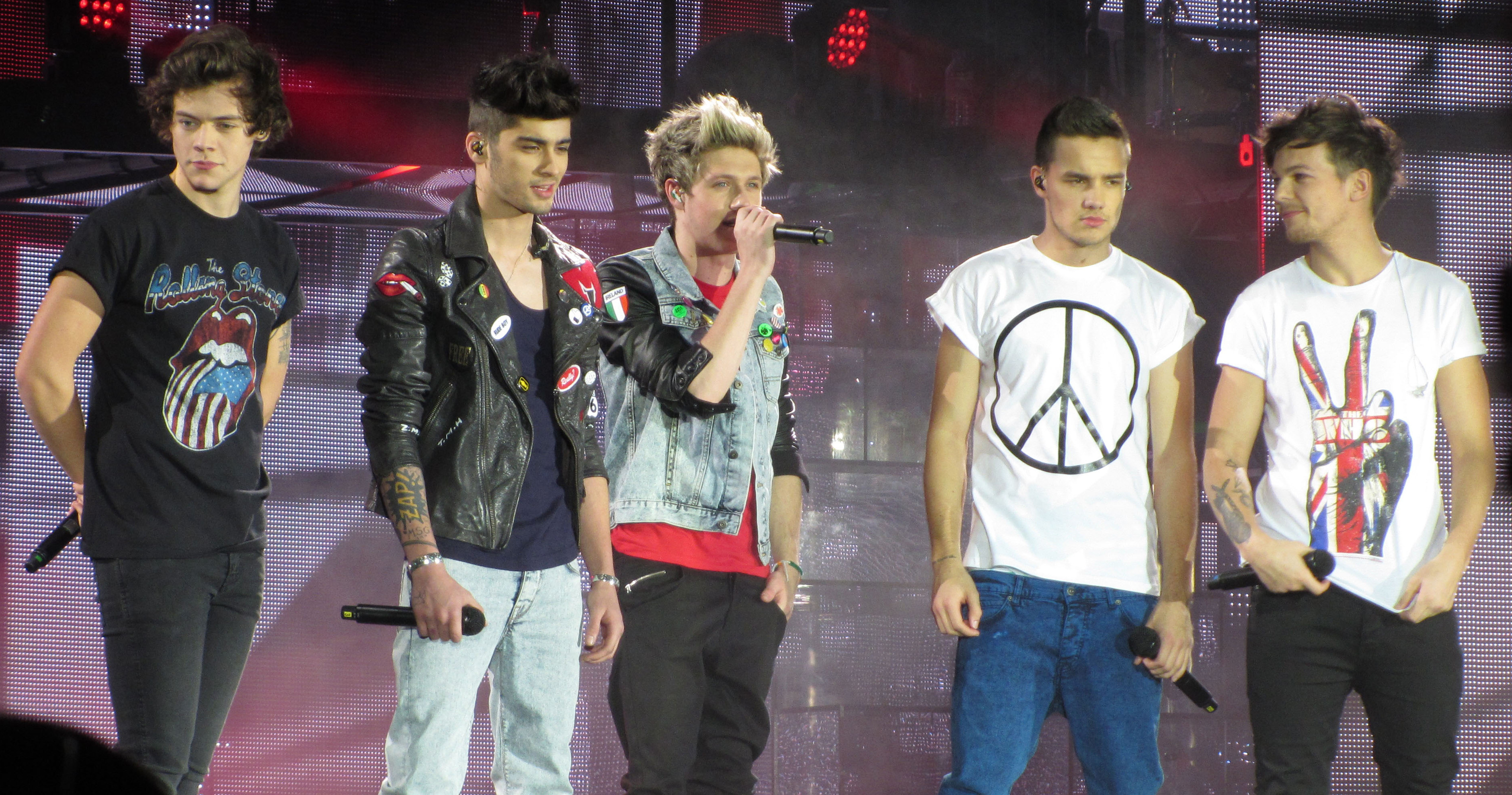
One Direction 2013

Gosling worked on One Direction's 2011 multi-Platinum selling, debut album Up All Night. He produced the track "Moments". The album was an international success, topping the charts in 16 countries. The album debuted at number 2 on the UK albums chart and became the UK's fastest selling debut album of 2011. Up All Night went straight to number 1 on the United States Billboard 200, selling 176,000 copies in its first week, making One Direction the first British group in US chart history to achieve this feat with their debut album.

Gosling worked on the band's follow-up album in 2012, titled Take Me Home. "Little Things", the second single from the album, was produced by Gosling and co-written by Ed Sheeran and Fiona Bevan, and it debuted at number 1 in the UK Official Singles Chart. Gosling also produced album track "Over Again". Take Me Home has been number 1 in over 20 countries and is certified as 3× Platinum in the UK, with "Little Things" being certified as Platinum in the US. Gosling also worked alongside Ryan Tedder on the track "Right Now", which appears on One Direction's third studio album Midnight Memories. Midnight Memories was the best selling artist album of 2013 with sales in excess of 685,000 for the year and is also certified as 2× Platinum in the UK and Platinum in the USA.

== Paloma Faith ==
In 2012, Gosling worked with female solo artist Paloma Faith on her UK double Platinum selling album Fall to Grace, which peaked at number 2 in the UK Albums Chart in May 2012. Gosling collaborated with longtime friend and colleague Nellee Hooper, of Massive Attack fame, who has also produced world-wide stars such as U2 and Madonna. The album's lead single "Picking Up the Pieces" peaked at number 7 in the UK singles chart and was co-produced by Gosling. The follow-up single "30 Minute Love Affair" was also co-produced by Gosling. The album became Faith's highest UK chart position to date.

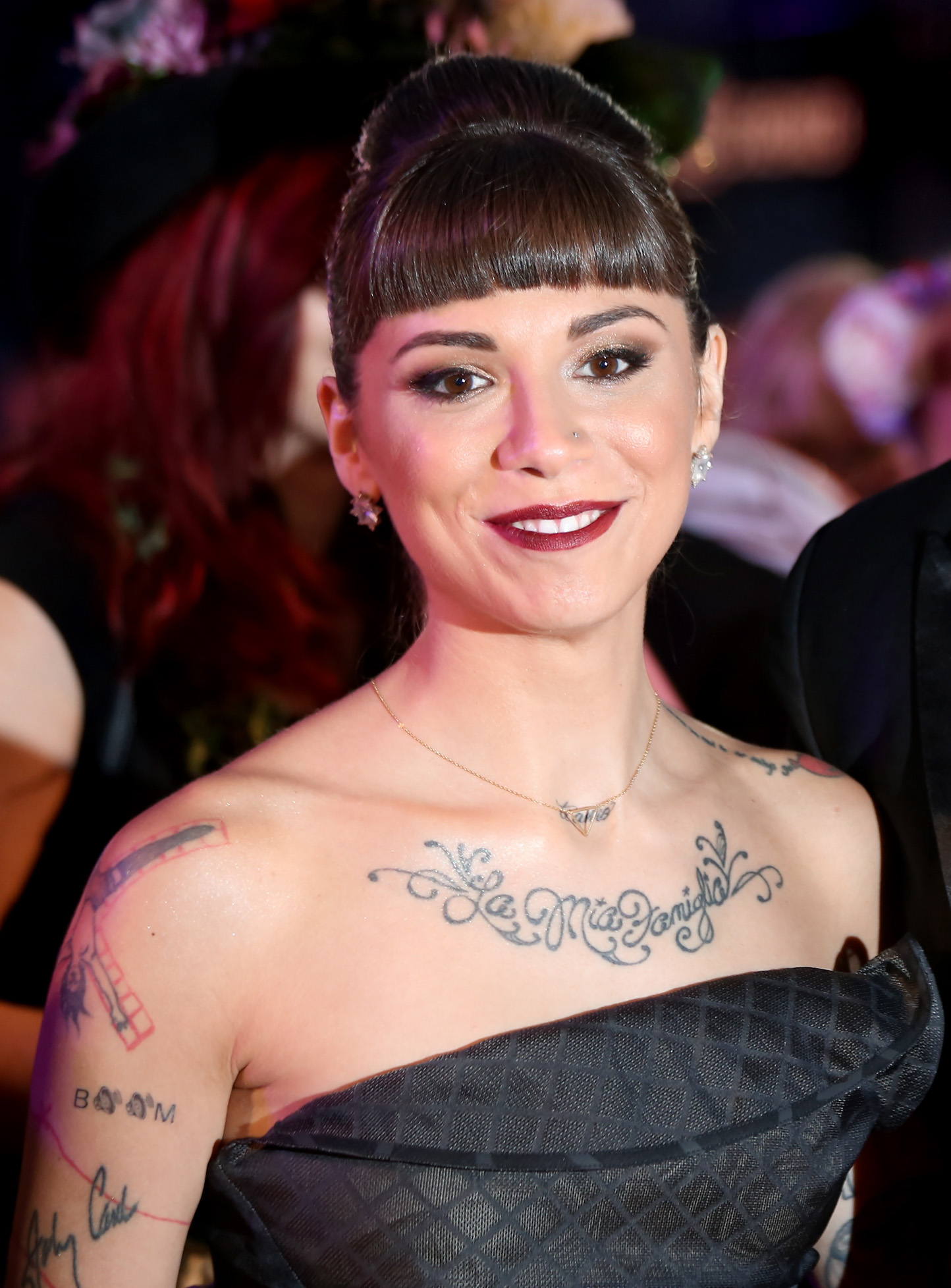
Christina Perri on the red carpet of the 2014 Life Ball

== Christina Perri ==
Gosling produced 9 of the 13 tracks on Christina Perri's second studio album Head or Heart, released in March 2014 on Atlantic Records. The album reached number 4 on the US Billboard 200 and number 8 on the UK albums chart. "Human", the lead single from the album, peaked at number 14 in the UK and number 31 in the US, where it was certified as gold.

== The Libertines ==
In 2015, Gosling was asked to produce the comeback album Anthems for Doomed Youth for the British rock band The Libertines. The album contains two notable literary references, the tracks "Anthem for Doomed Youth" and "Gunga Din" referencing poems of the same titles by Wilfred Owen and Rudyard Kipling respectively. "Gunga Din" was released as the album's first single on 2 July 2015. The album's second single, "Glasgow Coma Scale Blues", was released on 20 August 2015. Both of which were produced by Gosling.

Reviews for the album were generally positive, earning a rating of 70 out of 100 on Metacritic, indicating generally favourable reviews.

== Shawn Mendes ==
In 2016 Gosling started working on Shawn Mendes's second album, Illuminate

Gosling produced 9 tracks on the album, which went to number 1 on the US Billboard 200 with 145,000 equivalent album units, of which 121,000 copies were pure album sales.

Joe Levy, writing for Rolling Stone noted "Illuminate mixes professions of romantic agony like "Mercy" (where a quietly hummed hook explodes into crashing drums), with nice-boy valentines like "Treat You Better" and bedroom come ons like "Lights On. For Jon Reyes of Idolator, "[Shawn's] most noticeable change, aside from the tight music hall sonics, is the subtle infusion of sex into the lyrics. He's graduated from songs like "Kid in Love" to fare like "Lights On" and "Patience." Both ballads paint clear pictures of behind-closed-doors moments, and the sexual nature of the lyrics doesn't qualify as innuendo by any means."

== Shania Twain ==
After completing the Shawn Mendes album Illuminate, Gosling was asked to work with another Canadian artist, this time being Shania Twain on her fifth studio album, Now. Now was released on 29 September 2017 by Mercury Nashville. It is Twain's first new studio album in 15 years, since her 2002 release, Up!.

Gosling produced 3 tracks on the main, including the promotional single "Poor Me". and a further track on the deluxe edition.

Now debuted at number one in the United Kingdom. It also entered at the top position in Australia, becoming her third album after Come on Over and Up! to reach the summit of the ARIA Albums Chart. In the United States, it additionally opened atop the Billboard 200 with 137,000 album-equivalent units, which included 134,000 album sales, and became her second number-one album in the country after Up!.

== Charts ==
Number one singles and albums Gosling has worked on: • One Direction – 'Up All Night' • Ed Sheeran – + Album 2011 • One Direction – "Take Me Home" 2012 • One Direction – "Little Things" 2012 • Paloma Faith – Fall to Grace 2012 • Ed Sheeran – x Album 2014 • Ed Sheeran – "Thinking Out Loud" Single 2014 In June 2015, "Thinking Out Loud" became the first single to spend a full year in the UK top 40 • James Bay – Chaos and the Calm Album 2015 • Shawn Mendes - Illuminate Album 2017 • Shania Twain's - Now Album 2017

Other songs and albums he has worked on: • Wiley (musician) – 'See Clear Now' 2008 • Ed Sheeran – Loose Change EP 2010 • Nina Nesbitt – 'The Apple Tree' 2012, 'Peroxide' 2014, Stay Out EP 2013, 'Way in the World' 2013 • Christina Perry – 'Head Or Heart' 2014 • Birdy – "Home" from the deluxe version of her album Fire Within 2013 • The Libertines – 'Anthem For Doomed Youth' 2015 • Bobby Bazini – 'Blood's Thicker Than Water' 2016 (Which appeared on the television programme Suits) • Jeremy Loops – 'Critical As Water' 2018 • Jeremy Loops – 'Gold' 2018 • Major Lazer ft. Mr Eazi, RAYE, Jake Gosling – "Tied Up" 2018 • Mario – 'Dancing Shadows' 2018 • Anteros – 'Fool Moon' 2019 • Honeyblood – 'Glimmer' 2019

- KSI - "Holiday" 2021 - UK number 2 single

• KSI - All Over the Place - UK number 1 2021 • Bugzy Malone - "Welcome to the Hood" 2021 • Digga D - Noughty by Nature 2022 - Uk number one

== Awards ==
- Topped Music Week's 2012 chart of the UK's most successful album producers over the preceding 12 months
- ASCAP Award - 'Lego House' 2014
- In 2015, Gosling was one of the producers of Ed Sheeran's album x, which won the BRIT Award for British Album of the Year.
- Co-producer of nominated - 57th Annual Grammy Awards for Best Album of the Year - x 2015
- Nominated as Producer - 58th Annual Grammy Awards for Record of the Year – 'Thinking Out Loud' 2016
- Nominated twice for Brit Awards' Producer of the Year, 2013, and 2015.

== Other projects ==
Gosling has worked with Scottish singer-songwriter Nina Nesbitt. He produced Nina's 2012 The Apple Tree EP and co-wrote the lead single, "The Apple Tree". Gosling produced Nesbitt's debut album, which was released in February 2014 and peaked at number 11 in the UK albums chart and number 1 in Nesbitt's native Scottish albums chart.

He co-produced Mikill Pane debut album Blame Miss Barclay, released in 2013. Gosling co-wrote the second single, "Nothing Really Matters", from Mr Probz's new album 2015 with writers Akon, Dennis Princewall Stehr, and Giorgio Tuinfort. Gosling has also produced and co-written on Taylor Berrett's debut album, who is signed to Warner Bros. Records in the US.

Gosling teamed up with Irish group the Original Rudeboys to produce and co-write their 2012 album This Life, which reached number 3 in the Irish Official Music Chart and has been certified as Platinum. Gosling has also worked on, as they are now known, O.R.B.'s second album, All We Are, which was released in March 2014 and reached number 2 in the Irish Chart.

He has also ventured into the world of film, co-writing with composer Ruth Barrett the score for the UK urban film Twenty8k, which was released in October 2012.

For the UK charity National Citizen Service, Gosling produced a cover of the Beatles' "Come Together" with a selection of the UK's new artists, which included Nina Nesbitt, Will Heard, Lewis Watson, Kimberly Anne, Chasing Grace, Olivia Sebastianelli, and Colour The Atlas.

In addition to songwriting and production, Gosling ran a new music night called Nobu Unplugged, an evening he organised with John Woolf to showcase up and coming artists. It was held at the Michelin star restaurant Nobu Berkeley St in London on the last Sunday of every month, and it featured the likes of Ed Sheeran, Nina Nesbitt, Laura Mvula, Jamie N Commons, Tori Kelly, Jacob Banks, and Rixton, amongst others. The night received critical acclaim from The Sunday Times, Culture Magazine, and Tatler Magazine.

Gosling runs a management company Sticky Management alongside Adam Coltman.
