= No.5 Collaborations Project =

EP by Ed Sheeran
- Released: 9 January 2011
- Recorded: 2010–2011
- Genres: Acoustic; folk; pop-rap; pop; hip hop; grime
- Length: 35:21
- Label: Self-released
- Producers: Jake Gosling; Ed Sheeran

Ed Sheeran chronology
Songs I Wrote with Amy (2010)	No.5 Collaborations Project (2011)	+ (2011)

No.5 Collaborations Project is a compilation extended play (EP) by English singer-songwriter Ed Sheeran. It was the final of five EPs he recorded with the hope of being signed by a record label, hence the title.

Musically the album combined sensitive production, with serious subject matters and "haunting" themes. Sheeran wanted each song to act as a musical and tried to avoid lyrics about women. The EP compiles tracks of collaborations with grime artists such as Devlin, Wiley, P Money, Ghetts, and JME. Henry Yanney of Soul Culture gave the EP a positive review and it peaked at number 46 on the UK Albums Chart.

== Development ==
"I'm always being introduced to new people that are really good. Being a songwriter myself, I love the way they put lyrics together. If you listen to Ghetts' flow, it's not necessarily like four-bar, four-bar, four-bar. He'll do a two and a half bar rhyme and then stop, and go into something else. And me as a songwriter, that sort of fascinated me, like how can you get away with that? That really interested me. I've started writing songs a bit more like that, lyrically."

— Sheeran discussing the "Grime" genre as an influence on his artistry.

The No.5 Collaborations Project was conceived to be a record with every song acting as a musical without "songs about girls". One track speaks of being in a car crash. This was a track which he wanted to be "a spiritual thing about being taken home". Another track lyrically tells the story of saying goodbye to someone. When he collaborated with artist and rapper Ghetts he wanted to bring-out "the old Ghetts" with a "grimy-beat" and with rapper JME he wanted to bring "humour to the project". The title derived from a time when there was no "hype" surrounding Sheeran and he decided to create a buzz by producing five EPs: an indie-style EP, a singer-songwriter EP, a folk-style EP, a live EP and a collaborations EP, the latter fifth EP leading to the title No.5 Collaborations Project. These five EPs (You Need Me, Loose Change, Songs I Wrote with Amy, and Live at the Bedford, respectively) would later be collected and released in a full album, simply titled "5."

== Music and reception ==
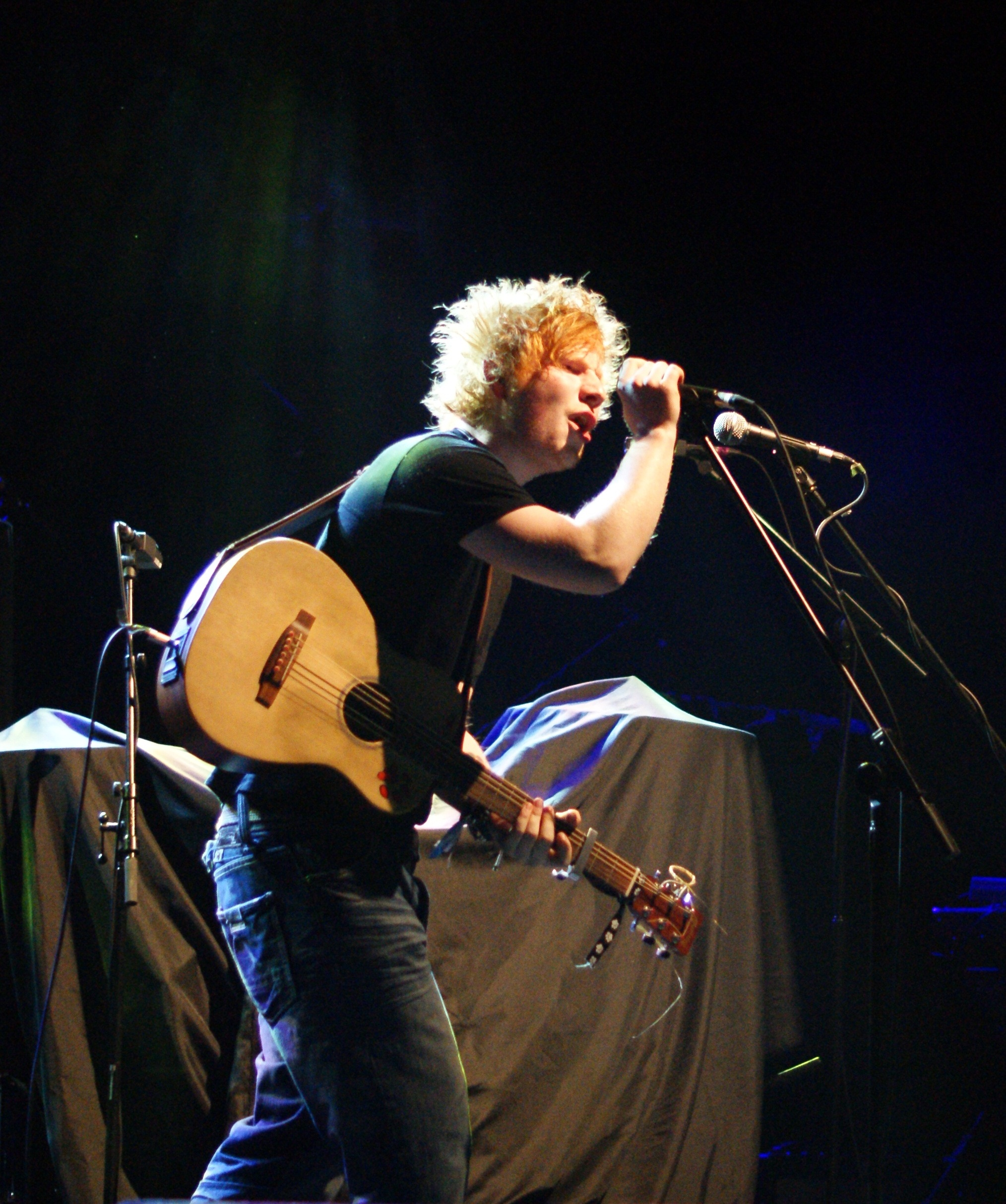
Sheeran performing at Academy 1 in Manchester

The EP is composed of "haunting" and "sensitive production" which "meshes the protagonist's acoustic compositions with sombre, intense beats". The first track, "Lately," features rapper Devlin and, lyrically, discusses insomnia and stress deriving from their work as musicians. The next track, "You," features rapper Wiley and speaks lyrically of family. The next track, actually titled "Family" and featuring P Money, creates a "tense atmosphere" and recalls a near fatal car crash which P Money was involved in. The dark mood is furthered with track "Little Lady", a re-recording of Sheeran's single "The A Team", which features three rap verses from Mikill Pane.

Henry Yanney of Soul Culture gave the EP four out of five marks, calling Sheeran an "excellent storyteller" and finding "The folk-meets-indie-meets-poetry format seemingly encourages/forces the guests on board to produce more reflective, thoughtful lyricism than per usual". Yanney discussed Sheeran's mainstream success with the EP noting, "For an artist on the precipice of mainstream recognition, No.5 Collaborations Project is arguably the most anti-commercial project to emerge from someone at that level", concluding his review by stating "The EP which solidifies his 'One To Watch' tag, Ed Sheeran, on pure talent alone, remains one of this year's most promising talents". In the United Kingdom the album spent one week on the UK Albums Chart placing at number 46.

== Track listing ==
No.	Title	Length
1.	"Lately" (featuring Devlin)	4:32
2.	"You" (featuring Wiley)	3:26
3.	"Family" (featuring P Money)	4:15
4.	"Radio" (featuring JME)	3:41
5.	"Little Lady" (featuring Mikill Pane)	5:31
6.	"Drown Me Out" (featuring Ghetts)	4:24
7.	"Nightmares" (featuring Random Impulse, Sway and Wretch 32)	4:05
8.	"Goodbye to You" (featuring Dot Rotten)	5:27

== Charts ==
Chart (2011)	Peak position
UK Albums Chart	46

== Certifications ==
Region	Certification	Certified units/sales
United Kingdom (BPI)	Silver	67,461

== Release history ==
Country	Date	Format	Label
United Kingdom	7 January 2011	CD; digital download; LP	Self-released
