= Songs I Wrote with Amy =

EP by Ed Sheeran
- Released: 18 April 2010; 9 December 2011 (re-release); 12 May 2015 (5 re-release); 26 February 2016 (vinyl re-release)
- Studios: Sticky Studios, Surrey
- Length: 16:28
- Labels: Sheeran Lock; Paw Print Records; Atlantic, Gingerbread Man Records
- Producer: Jake Gosling

Ed Sheeran chronology
Loose Change (2010)	Songs I Wrote with Amy (2010)	No.5 Collaborations Project (2011)

Songs I Wrote with Amy is an extended play, independently released by Ed Sheeran on 18 April 2010. All of the songs were written collaboratively by Ed Sheeran and Amy Wadge. The EP is a folk album of what journalist David Nolan described as "polite, discreet adult offerings aimed at a grown-up audience," with "world-weary songs of mornings after, indecision and regret."

== Background and release ==
Songs I Wrote with Amy is the third of a series of five EPs in different genres that Ed Sheeran released independently in quick succession from 2009 to 2010. The previous EP, 2010's Loose Change, sold enough copies for Sheeran to afford to record a follow-up two months later.

A few years prior, Sheeran's management company had introduced Sheeran to English singer-songwriter Amy Wadge. He traveled to Wales, where she lived, and the two wrote seven songs in two days in Wadge's shed. These included "She," about which Wadge commented to BBC Wales: "He was 17 when he came up with [the lyrics]. I knew right then he was incredibly special."

The two songwriters kept in touch and continued to write together, and Sheeran wanted her to sing backing vocals on an EP of five of their collaborations. However, Wadge was pregnant at the time with her second child and could not travel to Sticky Studios to record their songs. Instead, Sheeran brought in folk singer-songwriter Leddra Chapman to record backing vocals in her place. Chapman also sang with Sheeran when he performed these songs on tour.

Songs I Wrote with Amy, like his last two EPs, was produced by Jake Gosling. The EP was more jazz- and folk-influenced than Sheeran's last recordings in the series, with a gentler sound and reflective lyrics, some dedicated to Sheeran's first love Alice Hibbert. Biographer Sean Smith described lead track "Fall" as "a proper soppy love song," and Nolan compared "Where We Land" to Damien Rice.

Sheeran's commercial sales later grew enough for his fifth EP in the series, No. 5 Collaborations Project, to reach #2 on the iTunes chart. This brought renewed attention to Songs I Wrote with Amy, and the EP went on to make the iTunes chart as well. Later, after the success of Sheeran's debut +, Sheeran re-released five of his EPs including Songs I Wrote with Amy, which came out for the second time on 9 December 2011. He chose "Fall" as a B-side for the US release of breakout single "The A Team." "Fall" would later be used in the proposal scene for the season 3 premiere of the American sitcom Cougar Town.

In 2015, Sheeran released a new box set, 5. This set featured five of his previously independently released EPs, including Songs I Wrote with Amy.

== Track listing ==
All songs written by Ed Sheeran and Amy Wadge.

Songs I Wrote with Amy
No.	Title	Length
1.	"Fall"	2:43
2.	"Fire Alarms"	2:24
3.	"Where We Land"	3:03
4.	"Cold Coffee"	4:14
5.	"She"	4:04
Total length:		16:28

== Personnel ==
Adapted from the album liner notes:

- Ed Sheeran – vocals, guitar, electric guitar, co-production
- Leddra Chapman – backing vocals
- Jake Gosling – keyboard, production, mixing, mastering
