= Mikill Pane =

- Born: Justin-Smith Ikpaema Peter Damian Uzomba; 22 May 1985 (age 41); Hackney, England
- Origin: Hackney, England
- Genres: Indie, British hip hop, UK rap
- Occupations: Rapper, songwriter
- Years active: 2010–2020
- Label: Mercury Records
- Website: www.mikillpane.com

Justin-Smith Ikpaema Peter Damian Uzomba (from Hackney, London) better known by his stage name Mikill Pane, is an English rapper signed to Mercury Records. He is perhaps best known for his track "Little Lady" with Ed Sheeran which features on Ed's No. 5 Collaborations Project. The song is currently the biggest-selling track on the release.

Pane has supported Mac Miller, Rizzle Kicks and Ed Sheeran on nationwide tours.

== Career ==
His debut four-track EP The Guinness & Blackcurrant was released in 2011 and his second EP titled The Morris Dancer was released on 10 February 2012, consisting of four original tracks and a remix by Will Power.

He released the free EP You Guest It on 22 April 2012 through SB.TV, featuring collaborations with Ed Sheeran, Example, Paloma Faith, Yasmin, P Money, Fem Fel, Katie Price and Jakwob. The release has received widespread acclaim with the media.

Mikill's debut single "Dirty Rider" was released on 8 November 2012. The extended play also features a remix by Calyx & TeeBee, two more original tracks titled "Smashing Bricks" and "The Craig Bang" and the music video for his collaboration with Rizzle Kicks, "Work".

His debut album Blame Miss Barclay was released in 2013 following the Lucky Strike EP, and received critical acclaim. The album peaked at number 62 on the UK Albums Chart. On 16 November 2013, Pane released the You Guest It Too EP as the sequel to his 2012 You Guest It EP. It features appearances from Newton Faulkner, Jordan "Rizzle" Stephens, Sway, Tigger Da Author and G FrSH as well as a remix of Lorde's "Royals".

Mikill presented a weekly show on FUBAR Radio between 2016 and 2020

Justin Smith Uzomba retired the Mikill Pane persona in 2020 in order to focus on establishing himself as a filmmaker.

== Discography ==
=== Singles ===
Title	Year	Peak chart positions	Album
Title	Year	UK	Album
"Good Feeling"	2013	174	Blame Miss Barclay

=== Albums ===
- Blame Miss Barclay (2013)
- Night Elm on Mare Street, Pt. 1 (2019)
- Night Elm on Mare Street, Pt. 2 (2020)

=== EPs ===
- The Guinness & Blackcurrant EP (2010)
- Party Animal EP (2010)
- Dirty Rider EP (2012)
- The Morris Dancer EP (2012)
- You Guest It EP (2012)
- Good Feeling EP (2013)
- Chairman of the Bored EP (2013)
- Lucky Strike EP (2013)
- You Guest It Too EP (2013)
- The Godfather EP (2014)
- Let MC It EP (2016)
