= List of top 10 singles in 2019 (Ireland) =

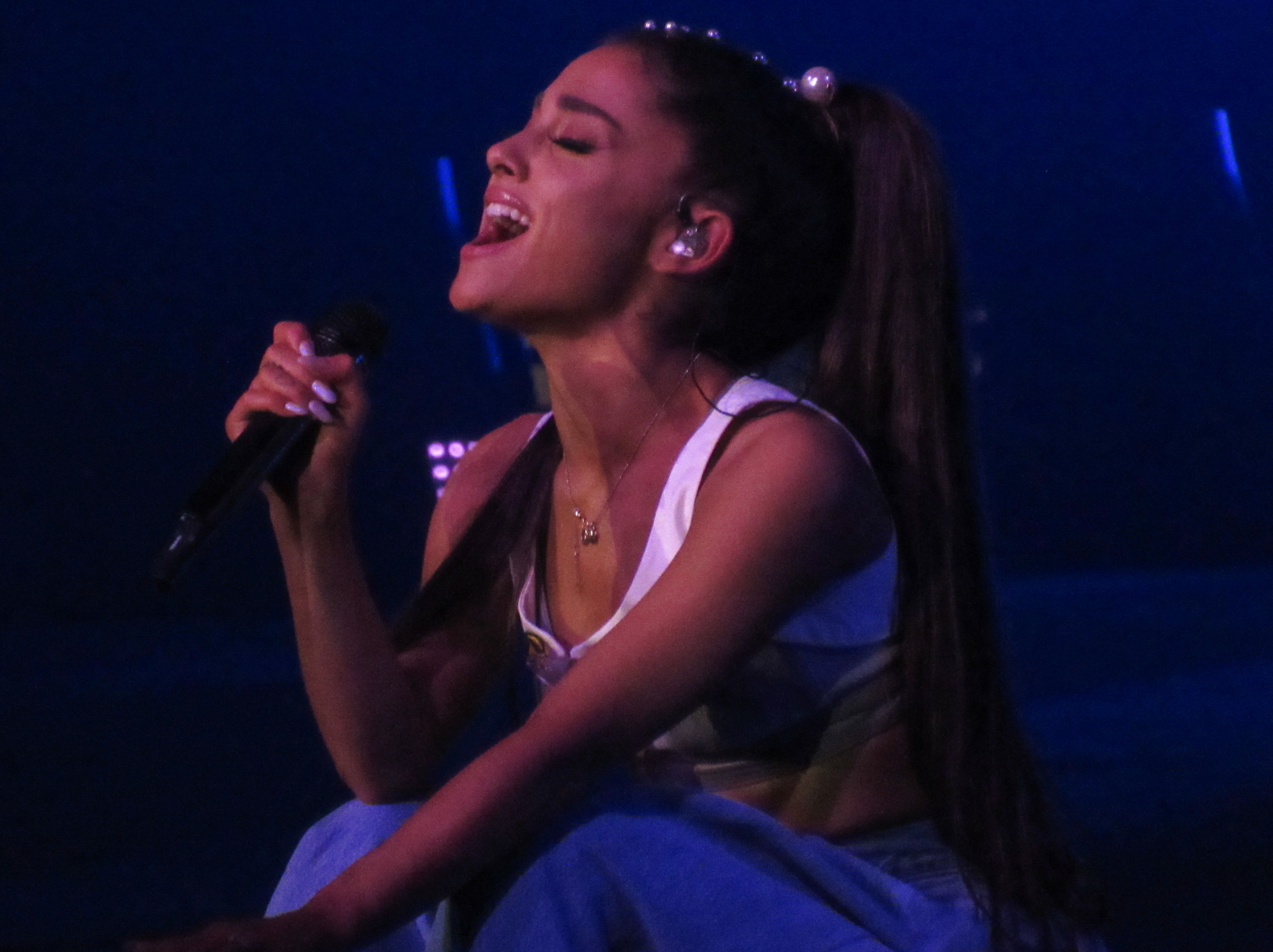
Ariana Grande has charted six singles in top ten, including two number ones, "7 Rings" and "Break Up with Your Girlfriend, I'm Bored."

This is a list of singles that have peaked in the top 10 of the Irish Singles Chart during 2019, as compiled by the Official Charts Company on behalf of the Irish Recorded Music Association.

== Top-ten singles ==
Key

Symbol	Meaning
◁	Indicates single's top 10 entry was also its Irish Singles Chart top 100 debut

Artist(s)	Single	Peak	Peak date	Weeks at #1	Ref.
Post Malone and Swae Lee	"Sunflower" ◁	3	4 January	-	
Keala Settle and The Greatest Showman Ensemble	"This Is Me"	8	4 January	-	
Hugh Jackman, Keala Settle, Zac Efron, Zendaya	"The Greatest Show"	9	4 January	-	
Mark Ronson featuring Miley Cyrus	"Nothing Breaks Like a Heart"	2	11 January	-	
Ellie Goulding and Diplo featuring Swae Lee	"Close to Me"	8	11 January	-	
Westlife	"Hello My Love" ◁	2	18 January	-	
Khalid	"Saturday Nights"	9	18 January	-	
Ariana Grande	"7 Rings" ◁	1	25 January	4	
Post Malone	"Wow."	2	1 February	-	
J. Cole	"Middle Child" ◁	3	1 February	-	
Sam Smith and Normani	"Dancing with a Stranger" ◁	4	8 February	-	
Billie Eilish	"Bury a Friend" ◁	2	8 February	-	
Ariana Grande	"Break Up with Your Girlfriend, I'm Bored" ◁	1	15 February	1	
Ariana Grande	"Needy" ◁	5	15 February	-	
Calvin Harris and Rag'n'Bone Man	"Giant"	3	1 March	-	
Lewis Capaldi	"Someone You Loved"	1	1 March	6	
Jonas Brothers	"Sucker" ◁	2	8 March	-	
Hozier	"Almost (Sweet Music)"	8	22 March	-	
Mabel	"Don't Call Me Up"	3	29 March	-	
Lauv and Troye Sivan	"I'm So Tired..."	4	29 March	-	
Pink	"Walk Me Home"	6	29 March	-	
Tom Walker	"Just You and I"	7	29 March	-	
Billie Eilish	"Bad Guy" ◁	2	5 April	-	
Billie Eilish	"Wish You Were Gay"	6	5 April	-	
Westlife	"Better Man" ◁	8	5 April	-	
Lewis Capaldi	"Grace"	9	5 April	-	
Lil Nas X	"Old Town Road"	1	12 April	4	
Khalid	"Talk"	8	19 April	-	
Avicii featuring Aloe Blacc	"SOS" ◁	5	19 April	-	
Marshmello featuring CHVRCHΞS	"Here with Me"	10	19 April	-	
Meduza featuring Goodboys	"Piece of Your Heart"	3	3 May	-	
Stormzy	"Vossi Bop" ◁	4	3 May	-	
Taylor Swift featuring Brendon Urie	"Me!" ◁	5	3 May	-	
Lewis Capaldi	"Hold Me While You Wait" ◁	1	10 May	1	
Shawn Mendes	"If I Can't Have You" ◁	7	10 May	-	
Ed Sheeran and Justin Bieber	"I Don't Care" ◁	1	17 May	6	
Lewis Capaldi	"One" ◁	6	24 May	-	
Jax Jones and Martin Solveig featuring Madison Beer	"All Day and Night"	7	14 June	-	
Dominic Fike	"3 Nights"	2	14 June	-	
Taylor Swift	"You Need to Calm Down" ◁	5	21 June	-	
Shawn Mendes and Camila Cabello	"Señorita" ◁	1	28 June	9	
Martin Garrix featuring Macklemore and Patrick Stump	"Summer Days"	8	5 July	-	
Ed Sheeran featuring Khalid	"Beautiful People" ◁	2	5 July	-	
Ed Sheeran featuring Chance the Rapper and PnB Rock	"Cross Me" ◁	6	19 July	-	
Ed Sheeran featuring Eminem and 50 Cent	"Remember the Name" ◁	4	19 July	-	
Stormzy	"Crown"	6	26 July	-	
Dermot Kennedy	"Outnumbered" ◁	2	2 August	-	
Mabel	"Mad Love"	6	9 August	-	
Sigala and Becky Hill	"Wish You Well"	8	9 August	-	
Ariana Grande and Social House	"Boyfriend" ◁	3	9 August	-	
Sam Smith	"How Do You Sleep?"	4	23 August	-	
Lil Tecca	"Ransom"	3	23 August	-	
Kygo and Whitney Houston	"Higher Love"	4	30 August	-	
Tones and I	"Dance Monkey"	1	30 August	8	
Ed Sheeran featuring Stormzy	"Take Me Back to London"	7	30 August	-	
Taylor Swift	"Lover"	9	30 August	-	
Joel Corry	"Sorry"	3	6 September	-	
Post Malone	"Circles" ◁	2	6 September	-	
Post Malone featuring Young Thug	"Goodbyes" ◁	4	13 September	-	
Post Malone	"Hollywood's Bleeding" ◁	8	13 September	-	
Ariana Grande, Miley Cyrus and Lana Del Rey	"Don't Call Me Angel" ◁	2	20 September	-	
Sam Feldt featuring Rani	"Post Malone"	4	27 September	-	
AJ Tracey	"Ladbroke Grove"	6	4 October	-	
Travis Scott	"Highest in the Room" ◁	3	11 October	-	
Dermot Kennedy	"Rome" ◁	5	11 October	-	
Dermot Kennedy	"What Have I Done" ◁	6	11 October	-	
Harry Styles	"Lights Up" ◁	4	18 October	-	
Regard	"Ride It"	1	25 October	1	
Lewis Capaldi	"Bruises"	8	25 October	-	
Ed Sheeran featuring Camila Cabello and Cardi B	"South of the Border"	6	25 October	-	
Picture This	"One Night" ◁	4	25 October	-	
Blackbear	"Hot Girl Bummer"	7	1 November	-	
Selena Gomez	"Lose You to Love Me"	1	1 November	1	
Kanye West	"Follow God" ◁	5	1 November	-	
Dua Lipa	"Don't Start Now" ◁	1	8 November	2	
Niall Horan	"Nice to Meet Ya"	7	15 November	-	
Billie Eilish	"Everything I Wanted" ◁	1	22 November	1	
Lewis Capaldi	"Before You Go"	1	29 November	8	
Meduza, Becky Hill and Goodboys	"Lose Control"	7	6 December	-	
Maroon 5	"Memories"	5	13 December	-	
Stormzy featuring Ed Sheeran and Burna Boy	"Own It" ◁	2	20 December	-	
Harry Styles	"Adore You" ◁	4	20 December	-	
Stormzy featuring Headie One	"Audacity" ◁	8	20 December	-	

== Entries by artist ==
The following table shows artists who achieved two or more top 10 entries in 2019. The figures include both main artists and featured artists and the peak position in brackets.

Entries	Artist	Songs
7	Ed Sheeran	"I Don't Care" (1), "Cross Me" (6), "Beautiful People" (2), "Remember the Name" (4), "Take Me Back to London" (7), "South of the Border" (6), "Own It" (2)
6	Lewis Capaldi	"Someone You Loved" (1), "Grace" (9), "Hold Me While You Wait" (1), "One" (6), "Bruises" (8), "Before You Go" (1)
5	Ariana Grande	"7 Rings" (1), "Break Up with Your Girlfriend, I'm Bored" (1), "Needy" (5), "Boyfriend" (3), "Don't Call Me Angel" (2)
5	Post Malone	"Sunflower" (3), "Wow." (2), "Goodbyes" (4), "Circles" (2), "Hollywood's Bleeding" (8)
5	Stormzy	"Vossi Bop" (4), "Crown" (6), "Take Me Back to London" (7), "Own It" (2), "Audacity" (8)
4	Billie Eilish	"Bury a Friend" (2), "Bad Guy" (2), "Wish You Were Gay" (6), "Everything I Wanted" (1)
3	Khalid	"Saturday Nights" (9), "Talk" (8), "Beautiful People" (2)
3	Taylor Swift	"Me!" (5), "You Need to Calm Down" (5), "Lover" (9)
3	Dermot Kennedy	"Outnumbered" (2), "Rome" (5), "What Have I Done" (6)
2
2	Harry Styles	"Lights Up" (4), "Adore You" (4)
2	Camila Cabello	"Señorita" (1), "South of the Border" (6)
2	Keala Settle	"This Is Me" (8), "The Greatest Show" (9)
2	Swae Lee	"Sunflower" (3), "Close to Me" (8)
2	Westlife	"Hello My Love" (2), "Better Man" (8)
2	Shawn Mendes	"If I Can't Have You" (7), "Señorita" (1)
2	Mabel	"Don't Call Me Up" (3), "Mad Love" (6)
2	Sam Smith	"Dancing With a Stranger" (4), "How Do You Sleep?" (4)
2	Miley Cyrus	"Nothing Breaks Like a Heart" (2), "Don't Call Me Angel" (2)
2	Meduza	"Piece of Your Heart" (3), "Lose Control" (7)
2	Goodboys	"Piece of Your Heart" (3), "Lose Control" (7)
2	Becky Hill	"Wish You Well" (8), "Lose Control" (7)

== See also ==
- 2019 in music
- List of number-one singles of 2019 (Ireland)
