= Blow (Ed Sheeran, Chris Stapleton and Bruno Mars song) =

2019 single by Ed Sheeran, Chris Stapleton and Bruno Mars

Single by Ed Sheeran, Chris Stapleton and Bruno Mars

from the album No.6 Collaborations Project
- Released: 5 July 2019
- Studio: Glenwood Place (Burbank, California)
- Genre: Rock; blues rock; hard rock
- Length: 3:29
- Label: Atlantic; Asylum
- Songwriters: Ed Sheeran; Chris Stapleton; Bruno Mars; Brody Brown; Frank Rogers; J.T. Cure; Bard McNamee; Gregory McKee
- Producer: Bruno Mars

Ed Sheeran singles chronology
"Beautiful People" (2019)	"Blow" and "Best Part of Me" (2019)	"Antisocial" and "South of the Border" (2019)

Chris Stapleton singles chronology
"Millionaire" (2018)	"Blow" (2019)	"Love Me Anyway" (2019)

Bruno Mars singles chronology
"Please Me" (2019)	"Blow" (2019)	"Leave the Door Open" (2021)

Music video
- "Blow" on YouTube

"Blow" (stylised in all uppercase) is a song by English singer-songwriter Ed Sheeran and American singer-songwriters Chris Stapleton and Bruno Mars. It was released on 5 July 2019 through Asylum and Atlantic Records, along with "Best Part of Me", as the fourth and fifth singles respectively from his fourth studio album No.6 Collaborations Project (2019). "Blow" was co-written by Sheeran, Stapleton, Mars, Brody Brown, Frank Rogers, J.T. Cure, Bard McNamee and Gregory McKee. Mars produced the song and played all the instruments except the bass. "Blow" is a rock, blues rock and hard rock song. Lyrically it is about a lover who leaving someone spurned crazy; it is mixed with gun references and sexual innuendo.

Music critics gave "Blow" mixed reviews, with some praising the singer's vocals and the song's hard rock sound, while others criticised the lyrics calling the sound dated. The song reached number 60 on Billboard Hot 100 and 39 on the Canadian Hot 100, being certified platinum by Music Canada (MC). It also peaked at number three on the US Hot Rock & Alternative Songs, number four on Canada Rock and number 21 on the Australian Singles Charts. In the music video which is directed by Mars and Florent Dechard, Sheeran, Stapleton and Mars are replaced by an all-female rock band. The song was performed at The Viper Room.

== Background ==
During an interview with Charlamagne tha God discussing his No.6 Collaborations Project (2019), Ed Sheeran revealed that he had been inspired by Christina Aguilera's collaboration with Lil' Kim, Mýa and Pink on "Lady Marmalade" (2001). As a result, he worked with Justin Bieber and Bruno Mars. He said it would be "fun" to be on a record with them. The first person he reached out to was Mars who said, "Let's just do a song." The track's title was announced on 18 June 2019 as well as the guest artists who would record it. On 2 July 2019, Sheeran teased the release of "Blow" on Instagram.

Sheeran, Chris Stapleton and Mars wrote the track in a basement in Nashville. Sheeran said that the trio recorded various songs, but the single's rock sound came from Stapleton. Sheeran explained, "It was purely by accident with Stapleton... he played us the riff". However Sheeran and Mars had several arguments while working on the song, and "Bruno never stopped reminding him just which one of them had sold more records." Sheeran affirmed that people did not expect that kind of song from him and are surprised when they listen to it. Mars said it was a "privilege" working with Sheeran and Stapleton saying, "You never know what you're gonna land on when you collaborate with other musicians". He and Sheeran said they had fun recording the song.

== Production and release ==
"Blow" was written by Sheeran, Stapleton, Mars, Brody Brown, Frank Rogers, J.T. Cure, Bard McNamee and Gregory McKee. Mars was a producer and he played the guitar, drums and the moog. Brown played the bass. Charles Moniz and Joe Rubel, with engineering assistant Jacob "The Menace" Dennis, engineered the song. The track was mixed by Manny Marroquin at Larrabee Sound Studios, Los Angeles with Chris Galland serving as a mixing engineer assisted by Robin Florent and Scott Desmarais. It was mastered by Stuart Hawkes at Metropolis Mastering in London.

"Blow" premiered on 5 July 2019, on Australian radio station KIIS 106.5. Atlantic and Asylum Records released the song on the same day, along with Sheeran and Yebba's "Best Part of Me" (2019), to digital download and streaming services in various countries. Atlantic released the single on 8 July 2019, to several radio formats including active rock, contemporary hit radio and Hot AC radio stations in the United States. On 10 July 2019, the single was re-released to active rock.

== Composition ==
"Blow"
A 20-second sample of "Blow", where Stapleton sings a portion of the chorus.

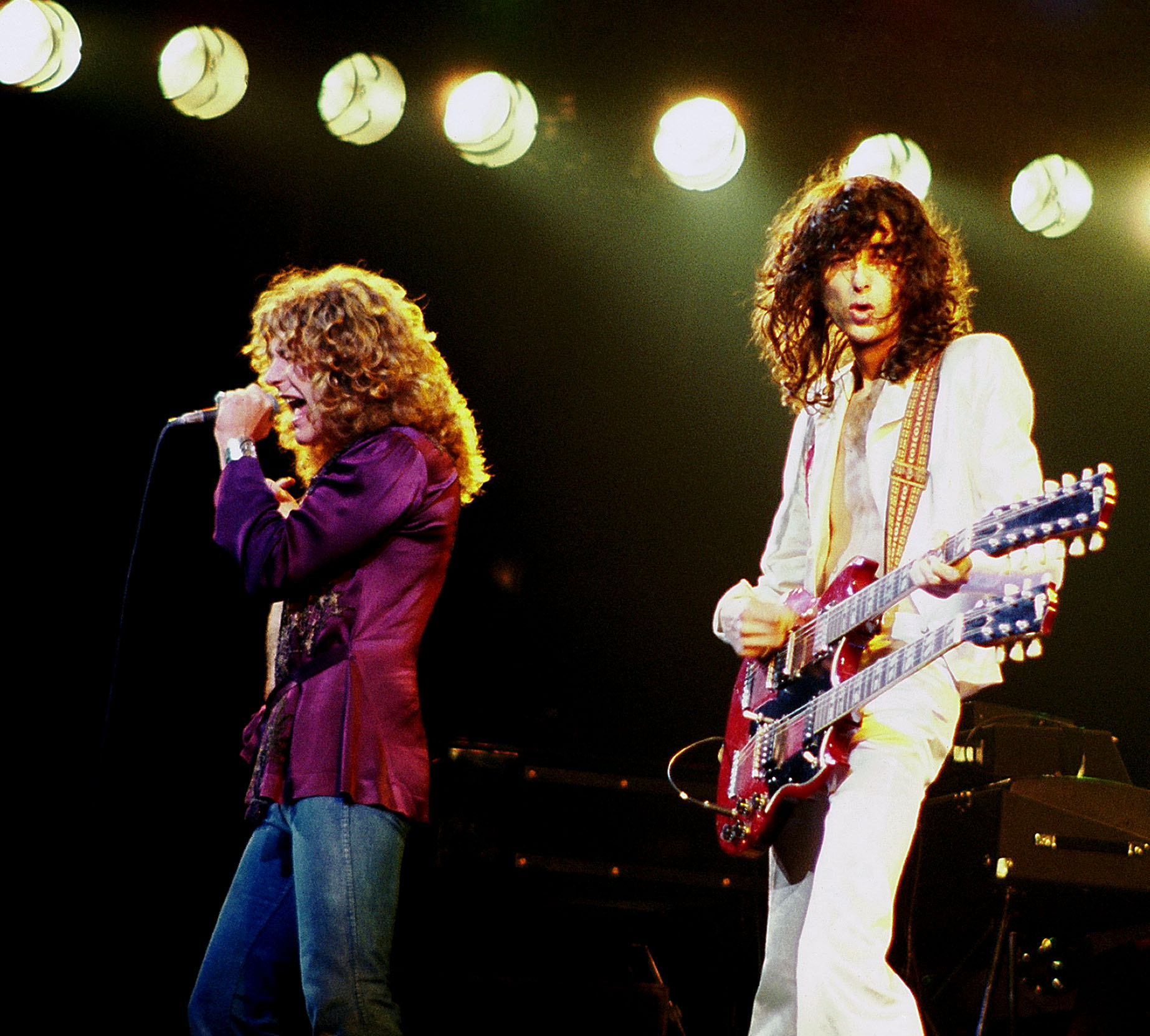
Critics have compared "Blow" to the music of Led Zeppelin and other rock bands.

"Blow" is a rock, blues rock and hard rock song. It features a "chunky-fun" 80s heavy-metal "distorted electric guitar riff". The screeching guitar is accompanied by a lively drumbeat which "bounce[s] off [the] ears" and an extended shouted high note. "Blow" is an upbeat track, composed in the key of E-flat minor with a tempo of 92 beats per minute. They showcase "Stapleton's familiar howl, a soulful Mars", as well as an uncommon "rough-around-the-edges" Sheeran.

AllMusic's Stephen Thomas Erlewine and Slant Magazine's Seth Wilson, respectively described the single as loud and crazy; Erlewine says it is a "churning rocker". Alexis Petridis of The Guardian compared its energy to a mix of Led Zeppelin with Queens of the Stone Age. Sarah Murphy of Exclaim! called "Blow" a strange fusion of each artists' genre—pop, rock, soul—with "Led Zeppelin worship". According to Jon Caramanica of The New York Times the sound evokes a "raucous quasi-Aerosmith screamfest".

Billboard's Jason Lipshutz felt the guitar riffs and lyrics seemed to be inspired by the Black Keys' album Let's Rock (2019). Lyrically, the single finds the trio "serenading a love interest" who leaves them insane. Stapleton sings in a verse: "Supernatural woman, supernatural freak / Don't know what you're doin,' got me feelin' weak / Oh, I wanna call you fever, baby, you can set a fire on me... pop it like a pistol, mama". Another lyric is "Pull my trigger, let me blow your mind". Mars says "Baby, tell me, what's your fantasy?" and Sheeran speaks of having a child "with his woman".

Ben Boddez writing for The Georgia Straight felt the recording is another example of the blending of music genres, which started with several newcomers dominating the top of the charts. Boddez opines that rock and roll could make its way into the mainstream by artists like Sheeran making "marketable pop music".

== Critical reception ==
"Blow" has received mixed reviews from music critics. Jason Lipshutz writing for Billboard enjoyed the track as the trio are "vocal pros and adapt to the sound capably", handling the style of the single. Malvika Padin from Clash believes the song "makes up for every failing becoming the perfect end to a long-winded journey." Ben Boddez of The Georgia Straight found Sheeran to have the least influence on the track, but not "out of place", with Mars's production and guitar solo and "powerhouse vocals" being the main focus and Stapleton being comfortable on the "heavier mix". Boddez named the song as "pretty fantastic". All Music's Stephen Thomas Erlewine commended Sheeran's collaborations choices, as it not only reaches new audiences, but also the choice of a "pop star as big as himself." Mike Nied of Idolator lauded the collaboration as it was "surprising" the singers reached a "common ground on a rock-infused anthem". The Tennessean's Matthew Leimkuehler was pleased and surprised with the "headbangin" recording. In a mixed review, Lucy Shanker from Consequence of Sound praised Sheeran's change in sound matching Stapleton's style. Shanker affirmed the song worked due to Stapleton being "one of the most talented musicians of this generation" and Sheeran having few verses.

On the other hand, Chris Willman of Variety said that despite "Blow" being "intriguing on paper" it is "pastiche", with the three artists being together on a "Rock of Ages" joke. Willman dubbed it as a "bogged down moment". NME's Nick Levine criticised Sheeran's vocals as they sound like "terrible hair metal come-ons" and dubbed the guitar solo as ironic. Levine concluded that "Blow" is "a fun piece of dress-up". Seth Wilson from Slant Magazine was disapproval towards the lyrics, as they "make L.A. Guns seem like Nobel laureates". Wilson concluded that "Blow" shows the problem with the album, in that "Sheeran opts to avoid his strengths." Neil McCormick of The Daily Telegraph called the song "retrogressive and fake", with the single objective of expand "the demographic of everyone involved." Winston Cook-Wilson writing for Spin described the song as "assaultive" and "puzzling", saying that there is "nothing fun about the actual process of listening".

== Commercial performance ==
"Blow" debuted at number 60 on the US Billboard Hot 100 with 26,000 downloads, 7.5 million streams and 1.5 million radio impressions in its first full tracking week. The single debuted at its number three peak on Hot Rock & Alternative Songs chart. This was Stapleton and Mars's first appearance on the chart, and Sheeran's first since 2013. The song also debuted at number one on Rock Digital Songs, marking each artist's first leader. The only Billboard Hot 100 component chart the song appeared on was Digital Song Sales, debuting at number four. "Blow" debuted at its peak of number 39 on the Canadian Hot 100 and peaked at number four on Canada Rock, spending twenty-five weeks there. It was certified platinum by Music Canada (MC).

It appeared at number 31 in Australia and entered at its peak, number 21, on the Scottish Single Charts. On the Czech Republic and Slovakia single charts, the song peaked at number 53 and 56, respectively. The song did not enter the NZ Top 40 Singles Chart, but peaked at number three on the NZ Hot Singles Chart. The track was certified gold by Recorded Music NZ (RMNZ). In the United Kindgom, "Blow" charted at number 21 on the Single Sales Chart and number 35 on the Streaming Chart. The single was certified silver by the British Phonographic Industry (BPI).

== Music video ==
Sheeran announced the music video was set to be released on 30 June 2019, however it was delayed until 8 July 2019. It was directed by Mars and Florent Dechard and shot in three days. One of the actresses featured in the video, Jordan Kelly DeBarge, affirmed: "Please believe me when I say blood sweat and tears went into the making of this masterpiece".

In the music video, Sheeran, Stapleton and Mars are replaced by an all-female band including a former America's Next Top Model Cycle 23 contestant Cherish Waters, model/actress DeBarge (who wears a black cowboy hat) and former I Know My Kid's a Star runner up, Cheyenne Haynes. Waters, who leads the girl group, gets the crowd excited and lip-syncs the song along with the band in front of a crowd of rock fans during a "raucous" show at The Viper Room, a Los Angeles nightclub. The three vocalists are accompanied by Francesca Simone, Venzella Joy and Lauren Dais as bandmates.

Joshua Espinoza of Complex called the video "incredible". Cook-Wilson from Spin described it as "tongue-in-cheek" and "energetic". Billboard's Gil Kaufman found the video to have "high-energy".

== Personnel ==
Credits adapted from the liner notes of No.6 Collaborations Project.

- Ed Sheeran – vocals, songwriter
- Chris Stapleton – vocals, songwriter
- Bruno Mars – vocals, songwriter, producer, guitar, drums, moog
- Brody Brown – songwriter, bass
- Frank Rogers – songwriter
- J.T. Cure – songwriter
- Bard McNamee – songwriter
- Greg McKee – songwriter
- Charles Moniz – engineering
- Joe Rubel – engineering
- Jacob "The Menace" Dennis – engineering assistance
- Manny Marroquin – mixing
- Chris Galland – mix engineering
- Robin Florent – mix engineering assistance
- Scott Desmarais – mix engineering assistance
- Stuart Hawkes – mastering

== Charts ==
=== Weekly charts ===
List of chart positions
Chart (2019)	Peak position
Australia (ARIA)	31
Belgium (Ultratip Bubbling Under Flanders)	4
Belgium (Ultratip Bubbling Under Wallonia)	28
Canada Hot 100 (Billboard)	39
Canada Rock (Billboard)	4
Czech Republic Singles Digital (ČNS IFPI)	53
Germany (GfK)	93
Lithuania (AGATA)	75
Netherlands (Tipparade)	11
Netherlands (Single Top 100)	96
New Zealand Hot Singles (RMNZ)	3
Scottish Singles Sales (Official Charts)	21
Slovakia Singles Digital (ČNS IFPI)	56
Sweden Heatseeker (Sverigetopplistan)	9
UK Audio Streaming (Official Charts)	35
UK Singles Sales (Official Charts)	21
US Billboard Hot 100	60
US Hot Rock & Alternative Songs (Billboard)	3
US Rock & Alternative Airplay (Billboard)	36
US Rolling Stone Top 100	33

=== Year-end charts ===
List of chart positions
Chart (2019)	Position
US Hot Rock & Alternative Songs (Billboard)	26

== Certifications ==
List of certifications
Region	Certification	Certified units/sales
Canada (Music Canada)	Platinum	80,000^{‡}
New Zealand (RMNZ)	Gold	15,000^{‡}
United Kingdom (BPI)	Silver	200,000^{‡}
^{‡} Sales+streaming figures based on certification alone.

== Release history ==
List of release history, showing region(s), date(s), format(s) and label(s)
Region	Date	Format	Label	Ref.
Various	5 July 2019	Digital download; streaming	Atlantic; Asylum	
United States	8 July 2019	AAA	Atlantic	
United States	8 July 2019	Active rock	Atlantic	
United States	8 July 2019	Alternative radio	Atlantic	
United States	8 July 2019	Contemporary hit radio	Atlantic	
United States	8 July 2019	Hot adult contemporary	Atlantic	
United States	10 July 2019	Active rock	Atlantic	
