= No.6 Collaborations Project =

2019 studio album by Ed Sheeran

Studio album by Ed Sheeran
- Released: 12 July 2019
- Recorded: 2018–2019
- Genres: Pop; hip-hop; R&B
- Length: 49:48
- Labels: Asylum; Atlantic
- Producers: Sheeran; Benny Blanco; Boi-1da; Kenny Beats; Fred Again; Jahaan Sweet; Steve Mac; Max Martin; Shellback; Bruno Mars; Nineteen85; Joe Rubel; Skrillex

Ed Sheeran chronology
÷ (2017)	No.6 Collaborations Project (2019)	= (2021)

Singles from No.6 Collaborations Project
- 1. "I Don't Care" Released: 10 May 2019; 2. "Cross Me" Released: 24 May 2019; 3. "Beautiful People" Released: 28 June 2019; 4. "Best Part of Me" Released: 5 July 2019; 5. "Blow" Released: 5 July 2019; 6. "South of the Border" Released: 12 July 2019; 7. "Antisocial" Released: 12 July 2019; 8. "Take Me Back to London" Released: 9 August 2019

No.6 Collaborations Project is the fourth studio album by English singer-songwriter Ed Sheeran. It was released on 12 July 2019 by Asylum and Atlantic Records. The album includes guest appearances from Khalid, Camila Cabello, Cardi B, Chance the Rapper, PnB Rock, Stormzy, Yebba, Justin Bieber, Travis Scott, Eminem, 50 Cent, Young Thug, J Hus, Ella Mai, Paulo Londra, Dave, H.E.R., Meek Mill, A Boogie wit da Hoodie, Skrillex, Chris Stapleton, and Bruno Mars. It is a sequel to Sheeran's 2011 compilation extended play, No.5 Collaborations Project.

Eight singles were released from No.6 Collaborations Project. Its lead single, "I Don't Care" reached atop the UK Singles Chart and number two on the Billboard Hot 100. Further released singles were "Cross Me", "Beautiful People", "Blow", "Best Part of Me", "Antisocial", "South of the Border", and "Take Me Back to London". Despite mixed reviews from critics, the album debuted atop both the UK Albums Chart and US Billboard 200, and was nominated for Best Pop Vocal Album at the 62nd Annual Grammy Awards.

== Background and release ==
Sheeran announced the album on 23 May 2019. In a post on Instagram, he said: "Before I was signed in 2011, I made an EP called No.5 Collaborations Project. Since then, I've always wanted to do another, so I started No.6 on my laptop when I was on tour last year. I'm a huge fan of all the artists I've collaborated with and it's been a lot of fun to make."

Sheeran released the album's track list on 23 May 2019, but the names of all the featured artists on the unreleased tracks were redacted. The track list includes 15 tracks, a departure from his previous three studio albums, which each consisted of 12 tracks. The track list including all guest appearances was revealed on 18 June 2019.

No.6 Collaborations Project was released on 12 July 2019. The album was made available for pre-order on 23 May 2019.

== Singles ==
The lead single of the album, "I Don't Care", a collaboration with Canadian singer Justin Bieber, was released on 10 May 2019. The song debuted and peaked at number one on the UK Singles Chart and number two on the US Billboard Hot 100.

The second single, "Cross Me", which features American rappers Chance the Rapper and PnB Rock, was released on 24 May 2019. as the album's second single. The song reached number four in the UK and number 25 on the Hot 100.

The third single, "Beautiful People", which features American singer-songwriter Khalid, was released on 28 June 2019. The song reached number one in the UK and number 13 on the Hot 100.

The dual fourth singles, "Blow", a collaboration with American singer-songwriters Chris Stapleton and Bruno Mars, and "Best Part of Me", which features American singer Yebba, were both released on 5 July 2019. The songs debuted and peaked at numbers 60 and 99 on the Hot 100, respectively.

The dual fifth singles, "Antisocial", a collaboration with American rapper and singer Travis Scott, and "South of the Border", which features Cuban-American singer Camila Cabello and Dominican-American rapper Cardi B, were both released alongside the album on 12 July 2019. The latter song reached number four in the UK and both songs reached at numbers 37 and 49 on the Hot 100, respectively.

The eighth and final single, "Take Me Back to London", which features British rapper Stormzy, was sent to UK radio airplay on 9 August 2019. The song reached number one in the UK.

== Critical reception ==
Professional ratings
Aggregate scores
Source	Rating
AnyDecentMusic?	5.4/10
Metacritic	57/100
Review scores
Source	Rating
AllMusic	3/5 stars
The Guardian	4/5 stars
The Independent	2/5 stars
NME	3/5 stars
Pitchfork	5.3/10
Slant Magazine	1.5/5 stars
The Telegraph	4/5 stars
Rolling Stone	3.0/5 stars

No. 6 Collaborations Project received mixed reviews from music critics. At Metacritic, which assigns a weighted average score out of 100 to reviews and ratings from selected mainstream critics, the album received an average of 57, based on 14 reviews, indicating "mixed or average reviews".

In a positive review, Alexis Petridis of The Guardian wrote that "unsurprisingly, the end result sounds not unlike a Top 20 rundown or Spotify's Hot Hits UK playlist" and that "Sheeran succeeds in pulling off his patent trick of simultaneously stunning you with the pitiless commercial efficiency of his writing while retaining a certain ordinary-bloke humanity," naming the album "smarm, charm and a watertight winning formula." Similarly, Neil McCormick of The Daily Telegraph says, "Sheeran has delivered a solid commercial showcase of the power of contemporary pop music brands. It is a case of Superstars Assemble. A fan base shared is a fan base multiplied." Nick Levine of NME concluded that "it's less an album, more a collection of savvy and generally savvy collaborations which blurs traditional genre boundaries unselfconsciously and acknowledges that Latin-pop is the sound of the near-future. Most of the time, it's a credit to Sheeran's songwriting skills and well-honed persona."

In a more mixed review, Helen Brown, writing for The Independent concluded that "though his fare is bland, it is sincere and hygienically prepared." Writing for Pitchfork, Rawiya Kameir opined that "few releases have been as baldly transparent and destined for ubiquity as No. 6, which has all the conspicuous mining of a Drake album, but very little of the finesse or cultural fluency" while criticizing Sheeran's rapping ability. Stephen Thomas Erlewin of AllMusic called out Sheeran's "blandiness" but complimented him for knowing "that this is the sound that defines global pop in 2019" and the fact that the album was full of multiple genres. Seth Wilson of Slant Magazine felt that Sheeran spends "the entirety of the album strenuously avoiding his strengths" and that "when Sheeran trots out his bad-boy routine, his music feels ersatz." Writing for Rolling Stone, Danny Schwartz opined that "Sheeran's unobtrusively sweet voice easily slips between genres, but he struggles to connect with many of his A-list guest artists, deepening the album's isolated mood." Malvika Padin of Clash called the record "worth a listen to catch those glimpses of experimentation" but felt that some songs "feel out of place and fail to impress despite the involvement of such acclaimed artists."

Lucy Shanker of Consequence of Sound wrote that "Sheeran has got the pop-song formula down pat" and that "he's versatile, or at least trying to be" but that "it doesn't pay off, though, because this effort results in a sense of emptiness, an abyss of authenticity or real feeling." Writing for The New York Times, Jon Caramanica opined that "even though this record presents countless opportunities for Sheeran to fumble, there is something to be said for his choice to release it at all" but that at times "he stretches too thin." Michael Cragg of The Observer called the record "a hotchpotch of genres and guests a laser-guided exercise in streaming monopoly, a credibility-by-osmosis playlist primed for summer dominance." Writing for Variety, Chris Willman wrote that "with such an impressive friends list, you hope for at least the illusion of chemistry somewhere along the way, but it's the ultimate Dropbox duets album" and that fans "need another set of songs as good and deeply felt as the ones that preceded this" although he did acknowledge that the album does have "less bogged down moments." In a negative review, Bernadette Giacomazzo of HipHopDX scored the album 2.5 of out five, opining that it "leaves a horrible taste in one's mouth" and that it "would go over better if Sheeran positioned this as a "pop" album rather than as a wannabe Hip Hop album," ending his review by writing "this is an experiment that could have worked — but, ultimately, didn't."

== Accolades ==
Year	Organization	Award	Result	Ref.
2019	People's Choice Awards	Album of 2019	Nominated	
2019	LOS40 Music Awards	Best International Album	Nominated	
2020	Grammy Awards	Best Pop Vocal Album	Nominated	
2020	Gaana User's Choice Icons	Best International Album	Nominated	
2020	Juno Awards	International Album of the Year	Nominated	

=== Year-end rankings ===
Publication	List	Rank	Ref.
GQ (Russia)	The 20 Best Albums of 2019	—N/a	

== Commercial performance ==
No. 6 Collaborations Project debuted at number one on the US Billboard 200 with 173,000 album-equivalent units (AEUs), including 70,000 pure album sales. It is Sheeran's third US number-one album. In its second week, the album stayed at number one on the chart, earning 78,000 album-equivalent units of which 16,000 copies in pure albums sales. On 23 September 2019, the album was certified gold by the Recording Industry Association of America (RIAA) for combined sales and album-equivalent units of over 500,000 units.

In the UK, the album debuted at number one on the Official Albums Chart with 125,000 AEUs - making it the fastest selling album of 2019 (as of 23 July 2019). In its first week, No. 6 Collaborations Project had 57,000 physical sales, 18,000 downloads and 70.2 million track streams in the UK. This is Sheeran's fourth UK number-one album.

The album debuted at number one in other 14 countries, including Australia, New Zealand, Ireland, Taiwan, Norway, Sweden, Belgium, the Netherlands and Finland. It also debuted at number two in Italy, France and Germany.

By the end of 2019, the album had sold 1.1 million pure copies worldwide, ranking as the seventh best selling album of that year. In China the album sold with 151,502 units on Chinese music platforms, including NetEase Cloud Music, Inc.

== Track listing ==
No.	Title	Writer(s)	Producer(s)	Length
1.	"Beautiful People" (featuring Khalid)	Ed Sheeran; Khalid Robinson; Fred Gibson; Shellback; Max Martin	Sheeran; Fred; Shellback; Martin; Alex Gibson^{[a]}	3:17
2.	"South of the Border" (featuring Camila Cabello and Cardi B)	Sheeran; Cabello; Belcalis Almanzar; Jordan Thorpe; Steve Mac; Gibson	Sheeran; Mac; Fred	3:24
3.	"Cross Me" (featuring Chance the Rapper and PnB Rock)	Sheeran; Chancelor Bennett; Rakim Allen; Gibson	Fred	3:26
4.	"Take Me Back to London" (featuring Stormzy)	Sheeran; Michael Omari, Jr.; Gibson; Martin; Shellback	Fred; Skrillex; Kenny Beats	3:09
5.	"Best Part of Me" (featuring Yebba)	Sheeran; Abbey Smith; Benjamin Levin	Sheeran; Benny Blanco; Joe Rubel	4:03
6.	"I Don't Care" (with Justin Bieber)	Sheeran; Bieber; Jason Boyd; Gibson; Shellback; Martin	Fred; Shellback; Martin	3:39
7.	"Antisocial" (with Travis Scott)	Sheeran; Jacques Webster II; Joseph Saddler; Gibson	Fred; A. Gibson^{[a]}	2:41
8.	"Remember the Name" (featuring Eminem and 50 Cent)	Sheeran; Marshall Mathers III; Curtis Jackson III; Andre Benjamin; Antwan Patton; Patrick Brown; Ray Murray; Rico Wade; Martin; Shellback	Sheeran; Fred; Shellback; Martin	3:27
9.	"Feels" (featuring Young Thug and J Hus)	Sheeran; Jeffery Williams; Momodou Jallow; Gibson	Fred	2:30
10.	"Put It All on Me" (featuring Ella Mai)	Sheeran; Ella Howell; Gibson	Fred	3:17
11.	"Nothing on You" (featuring Paulo Londra and Dave)	Sheeran; Londra; David Omoregie; Gibson; Daniel Oviedo; Cristian Salazar	Fred; Sam Tsang^{[a]}	3:20
12.	"I Don't Want Your Money" (featuring H.E.R.)	Sheeran; Paul Jefferies; Joe Reeves; Gibson	Nineteen85; Fred^{[b]}	3:24
13.	"1000 Nights" (featuring Meek Mill and A Boogie wit da Hoodie)	Sheeran; Robert Williams; Artist Dubose; Matthew Samuels; Gibson; Jahaan Sweet	Boi-1da; Fred; Sweet	3:32
14.	"Way to Break My Heart" (featuring Skrillex)	Sheeran; Sonny Moore; Mac	Skrillex; Mac	3:10
15.	"Blow" (with Chris Stapleton and Bruno Mars)	Sheeran; Christopher Stapleton; Peter Hernandez; Brody Brown; Frank Rogers; J.T. Cure; Bard McNamee; Greg McKee	Mars	3:29
Total length:				49:48

Notes

- ^{^a} signifies an additional producer
- ^{^b} signifies a co-producer
- "Blow" is stylised in all caps.

== Personnel ==
- Ed Sheeran – vocals (all tracks), production (tracks 1, 2, 5, 8), executive producer, guitar (tracks 2, 5, 8), bass (track 5)
- 50 Cent – vocals (track 8)
- Angad "Bainz" Bains – engineering (track 9)
- AJ Putman – engineering (track 13)
- Alex Estevez – engineering (track 13)
- Alex Gibson – additional production (tracks 1, 7)
- Anthony Cruz – engineering (track 13)
- Anthony Evans – editor (track 5)
- Archie Carter – assistant engineering (track 5)
- Benjy Gibson – backing vocals and percussion (track 6)
- Benny Blanco – drum programming, keyboards, and production (track 5)
- Boi-1da – production (track 13)
- A Boogie wit da Hoodie – vocals (track 13)
- Brody Brown – bass (track 15)
- Bruno Mars – drums, guitar, Moog, production, and vocals (track 15)
- Camila Cabello – vocals (track 2)
- Cardi B – vocals (track 2)
- Chance the Rapper – vocals (track 3)
- Charles Moniz – engineering (track 15)
- Chris Galland – mixing (track 12), mixing engineering (tracks 3, 10, 15)
- Chris Laws – engineering (track 14), programming (2)
- Chris Sclafani – engineering (track 5)
- Chris Stapleton – vocals (track 15)
- Dann Pursey – engineering (track 14)
- Dave – vocals (track 11)
- David Pizzimenti – engineering (track 10)
- Denis Kosiak – engineering (track 1)
- DJ Riggins – assistant mix engineering (tracks 9, 11, 14), engineer (tracks 4, 7, 13)
- Ella Mai – vocals (track 10)
- Emma Corby – brass arrangements (track 6)
- Eminem – vocals (track 8)
- Evan LaRay – engineering (track 2)
- Fred – ad-libs (track 4), backing vocals (tracks 1, 3, 4, 6, 7, 9–11), bass and drums (tracks 1–4, 6–12), beatbox (track 6), co-production (track 12), engineering (tracks 1, 3, 4, 6, 7, 9–13), guitar (tracks 1, 3, 4, 6–12), keyboards (tracks 1–4, 6–13), production (tracks 1–4, 6–11, 13), programming (tracks 1, 3, 4, 6–12), synthesizer (tracks 2, 13)
- Gabe Jaskowiak – recording (track 3)
- Geoff Swan – engineering (tracks 10, 12)
- George Seara – engineering (track 12)
- Georgia Gibson – saxophone (track 6)
- Gosha Usov – engineering (track 5)
- H.E.R. – vocals (track 12)
- Inaam Haq – assistant recording engineering (track 6)
- J Hus – vocals (track 9)
- Jacob "The Menace" Dennis – assistant engineering (track 15)
- Jacob Richards – assistant mix engineering (tracks 9, 11, 14), engineering (tracks 4, 7, 13)
- Jahaan Sweet – production (track 13)
- Jaime Estalella – engineering (track 8)
- Poo Bear – backing vocals (track 6)
- Jaycen Joshua – mixing (tracks 4, 7, 9, 11, 13, 14)
- Joe Reeves – guitar (track 12)
- Joe Rubel – drum programming (track 5), engineering (tracks 1, 4, 5, 9, 10, 15), keyboards, and production (track 5)
- Joe Strange – engineering (track 8)
- John Hanes – engineering (tracks 1, 2, 6)
- Josh Gudwin – production and recording (track 6)
- Justin Bieber – vocals (track 6)
- Kate Conklin – additional vocals (track 14)
- Kenny Beats – production (track 4)
- Khalid – vocals (track 1)
- Kid Culture – additional programming (track 14)
- Ky Miller – engineering (track 8)
- Liam Nolan – engineering (track 12)
- Luke Farnell – assistant engineering (track 9)
- Manny Marroquin – mixing (tracks 3, 10, 12, 15)
- Mark "Spike" Stent – mixing (track 5)
- Matt Wolach – mixing (track 5)
- Max Martin – backing vocals (track 6), keyboards (tracks 6, 8), producer (tracks 1, 6, 8), programming (track 8)
- Meek Mill – vocals (track 13)
- Michael Freeman – mixing (track 5)
- Michael Ilbert – engineering (tracks 1, 4, 6, 8)
- Mike Seaberg – assistant mix engineering (tracks 9, 11, 14), engineering (tracks 4, 7, 13)
- Mike Strange – engineering and mixing (track 8)
- Nineteen85 – bass, drums, keyboards, and production (track 12)
- Ovy on the Drums – engineering (track 11)
- Paul Anthony Morrison – engineering (track 11)
- Paulo Londra – vocals (track 11)
- PnB Rock – vocals (track 3)
- Pino Palladino – bass (track 5)
- Robert Sellens – assistant engineering (track 5)
- Robin Florent – assistant mix engineering (track 3, 10, 11), mixing (track 15)
- Sam Tsang – synthesizer, programming, and additional production (track 11)
- Scott Desmarais – assistant mix engineering (track 3, 10, 11), mixing (track 15)
- Serban Ghenea – mixing (tracks 1, 2, 6)
- Shaan Singh – engineering (track 9)
- Shellback – guitar (track 1), keyboards (tracks 6, 8), production, and programming (tracks 1, 6, 8)
- Simone Torres – engineering (track 2)
- Skrillex – mixing (track 14), production (tracks 4, 14)
- Steve Mac – keyboards and production (tracks 2, 14)
- Stormzy – vocals (track 4)
- Stuart Hawkes – mastering (all tracks)
- Tate McDowell – assistant engineering (track 10)
- Doveman – keyboards (track 5)
- Tom Norris – mixing (track 14)
- Tony Campana – engineering (track 8)
- Travis Scott – engineering and vocals (track 7)
- Tre Nagella – engineering (track 7)
- Yebba – vocals (track 5)
- Young Thug – vocals (track 9)

== Charts ==
=== Weekly charts ===
Chart (2019)	Peak position
Australian Albums (ARIA)	1
Austrian Albums (Ö3 Austria)	1
Belgian Albums (Ultratop Flanders)	1
Belgian Albums (Ultratop Wallonia)	1
Canadian Albums (Billboard)	1
Croatian International Albums (HDU)	1
Czech Albums (ČNS IFPI)	1
Danish Albums (Hitlisten)	2
Dutch Albums (Album Top 100)	1
Finnish Albums (Suomen virallinen lista)	1
French Albums (SNEP)	2
German Albums (Offizielle Top 100)	2
Hungarian Albums (MAHASZ)	1
Irish Albums (IRMA)	1
Italian Albums (FIMI)	2
Japanese Albums (Oricon)	6
Japanese Hot Albums (Billboard Japan)	5
Latvian Albums (LAIPA)	1
Lithuanian Albums (AGATA)	1
Mexican Albums (AMPROFON)	4
New Zealand Albums (RMNZ)	1
Norwegian Albums (VG-lista)	1
Polish Albums (ZPAV)	2
Portuguese Albums (AFP)	1
Scottish Albums (Official Charts)	1
Slovak Albums (ČNS IFPI)	1
South African Albums (RISA)	3
Spanish Albums (Promusicae)	1
Swedish Albums (Sverigetopplistan)	1
Swiss Albums (Schweizer Hitparade)	1
UK Albums (Official Charts)	1
US Billboard 200	1

=== Year-end charts ===
Chart (2019)	Position
Australian Albums (ARIA)	2
Austrian Albums (Ö3 Austria)	14
Belgian Albums (Ultratop Flanders)	14
Belgian Albums (Ultratop Wallonia)	43
Canadian Albums (Billboard)	10
Danish Albums (Hitlisten)	7
Dutch Albums (Album Top 100)	3
French Albums (SNEP)	46
German Albums (Offizielle Top 100)	8
Icelandic Albums (Plötutíóindi)	20
Irish Albums (IRMA)	5
Italian Albums (FIMI)	46
Mexican Albums (AMPROFON)	95
New Zealand Albums (RMNZ)	2
Polish Albums (ZPAV)	50
Spanish Albums (PROMUSICAE)	64
Swedish Albums (Sverigetopplistan)	22
Swiss Albums (Schweizer Hitparade)	10
UK Albums (OCC)	2
US Billboard 200	35
Worldwide Albums (IFPI)	7
Chart (2020)	Position
Australian Albums (ARIA)	12
Belgian Albums (Ultratop Flanders)	56
Belgian Albums (Ultratop Wallonia)	199
Canadian Albums (Billboard)	15
Danish Albums (Hitlisten)	30
Dutch Albums (Album Top 100)	8
French Albums (SNEP)	154
Irish Albums (IRMA)	15
Italian Albums (FIMI)	92
New Zealand Albums (RMNZ)	9
Polish Albums (ZPAV)	89
Spanish Albums (PROMUSICAE)	72
Swedish Albums (Sverigetopplistan)	82
UK Albums (OCC)	7
US Billboard 200	61
Chart (2021)	Position
Australian Albums (ARIA)	45
Canadian Albums (Billboard)	49
Danish Albums (Hitlisten)	94
Dutch Albums (Album Top 100)	42
New Zealand Albums (RMNZ)	36
UK Albums (OCC)	44
Chart (2022)	Position
Australian Albums (ARIA)	83
UK Albums (OCC)	95

== Certifications ==
Region	Certification	Certified units/sales
Australia (ARIA)	2× Platinum	140,000^{‡}
Austria (IFPI Austria)	Platinum	15,000^{‡}
Brazil (Pro-Música Brasil)	Platinum	40,000^{‡}
Canada (Music Canada)	4× Platinum	320,000^{‡}
Denmark (IFPI Danmark)	3× Platinum	60,000^{‡}
France (SNEP)	Platinum	100,000^{‡}
Germany (BVMI)	Platinum	200,000^{‡}
Hungary (MAHASZ)	Platinum	4,000^{‡}
Italy (FIMI)	Platinum	50,000^{‡}
Netherlands (NVPI)	Platinum	40,000^{‡}
New Zealand (RMNZ)	5× Platinum	75,000^{‡}
Poland (ZPAV)	Platinum	20,000^{‡}
Singapore (RIAS)	Platinum	10,000^{*}
Spain (Promusicae)	Gold	20,000^{‡}
United Kingdom (BPI)	3× Platinum	1,097,605
United States (RIAA)	Platinum	1,000,000^{‡}
^{*} Sales figures based on certification alone.^{‡} Sales+streaming figures based on certification alone.

== Release history ==
Region	Date	Format(s)	Label	Ref.
Various	12 July 2019	CD; digital download; streaming	Asylum; Atlantic	
