= Rachel Feinstein =

Rachel Feinstein may refer to:

- Rachel Feinstein (artist) (born 1971), American artist
- Rachel Feinstein (comedian), American actress and stand-up comedian
