= Greater New York =

Greater New York or Greater New York City may refer to:

- The statistical New York metropolitan area consisting of New York City and surrounding counties of New York, New Jersey, Connecticut, and Pennsylvania
- The so-called City of Greater New York, a common though unofficial term for the City of New York used in the years after the 1898 consolidation of the original, smaller City of New York with surrounding cities and towns to create the modern five boroughs
- The Greater New York art exhibition which takes place at MoMA PS1 every five years
