= Rachel Feinstein (artist) =

American artist

- Born: Rachel J. Feinstein; Fort Defiance, Arizona, U.S.
- Education: Columbia University (BA); Skowhegan School of Painting and Sculpture
- Known for: Sculpture

Rachel Feinstein (born May 25, 1971) is an American artist who specializes in sculpture. She is best known for baroque, fantasy-inspired sculptures like "The Snow Queen", which was drawn from a Hans Christian Andersen fairy tale. There have been over two dozen group and solo showings of her work in the United States, Europe, and Asia. She is married to painter John Currin. In 2011 The New York Times described them as "the ruling power couple in today's art world."

== Early life ==
Feinstein, the daughter of a dermatologist and a nurse, was raised in Miami, Florida. Her father is Jewish and her mother is Catholic. She became interested in art in elementary school and took private lessons. She graduated with a Bachelor of Arts from Columbia University in 1993, studying religion, philosophy, and studio art. In 1993 she also studied at the Skowhegan School of Painting and Sculpture in Maine. Feinstein applied for a Master of Fine Arts at Yale University, but believes she was rejected because she wore a transparent plastic miniskirt and a T-shirt reading "I'm a Satisfier" to the interview.

== Career ==
In 1994, Feinstein's works were shown for the first time in the Sonnabend Gallery Artist Invitational group show. In that year she also showed at the Exit Art "Let the Artist Live" exhibit, where she built Sleeping Beauty's gingerbread house and slept in it.

In 1999 while Feinstein was working as a receptionist at the Marianne Boesky Gallery, Boesky saw some of her sculpture sketches and let her go from that position so that she could show her works. This was Feinstein's first solo show. The gallery has had three showings of her work.

In 2002 Feinstein and Currin published a 24-page book of their works at the Hydra Workshop in Hydra, Greece, which they titled The Honeymooners: John Currin and Rachel Feinstein. It includes an interview conducted by Sadie Coles HQ.

In 2008 Feinstein published a signed, limited edition full-color catalog of her works over the previous ten years. The introduction was written by author James Frey and the book includes an interview conducted by filmmaker Sofia Coppola.

In 2019 Feinstein opened her first solo museum survey in the United States, "Maiden, Mother, Crone" at the Jewish Museum in New York. The exhibition opened to the public on November 1, 2019, and was organized by Kelly Taxter, the museum's contemporary art curator.

Feinstein inspired a 2004 collection by Marc Jacobs. Her and Currin's apartment loft, described as the "most stylish apartment south of Houston Street", was featured in the December 2010 issue of The World of Interiors after S.I. Newhouse Jr., the chair of Condé Nast, dined at the apartment. Tom Ford included Feinstein in his new women's fashion show in 2010. Vogue reported on her 40th birthday party in her and Currin's town house in Gramercy Park; its theme was "Miss Havisham" and guests were told to "[d]ress Edwardian."

== Works ==
Feinstein's mediums include oil paint on glass and sculptures made of plaster and carved wood. Her work has been described as creating a "baroque kitsch fantasy-land". One reviewer wrote that her work has "exposed (but also relied on) the ways in which flourish has been historically coded as feminine."

In 2000 Feinstein exhibited works in "Pastoral Pop!" at the Whitney Museum of American Art and at "The Americans: New Art" at the Barbican Centre. Her 2001 debut solo show was inspired by her trip to palaces in Munich and Vienna.

In 2004 Feinstein displayed her plywood sculpture "The Crucifixion" at the Friedrich Petzel Gallery. The life-sized depiction consisted of four figures: Jesus on the cross, Mary at his feet, John the Baptist, and John the Apostle. A reviewer remarked that rather than making a joke of the scene, as several contemporary artists had done, she had produced a work that was "startling" as well as "evocative and fresh."

In 2005 Feinstein produced a show at the Marianne Boesky Gallery featuring elderly women posed in ornate costumes and wigs. She painted them in oils on ovals of glass and had them photographed. Her inspiration for the set of pieces was Miss Havisham from Great Expectations. An Artforum review by Johanna Burton noted that the costume and pose of one drawing was a "nearly identical copy" of a Feinstein photograph in a Marc Jacobs advertisement from the year before and that the elderly model looked much like Feinstein might look when she aged. The reviewer wrote the "(self-)portraits" felt "in line with the current vogue for noble iconography" and also described them as "celebratory caricatures, self-indulgent and vain." She also criticized the one foam and three wood sculptures from the exhibition as "merely clunky hybrids of kitschy Cubism and craft."

In 2007 a steel gilded equestrian statue she called "Cuatro" (for Don Quixote) became part of the Public Art Project of Anyang, South Korea. It is six meters high.

Feinstein's 2008 show "Puritan's Delight" combined pieces displaying "disparate references to art history, cultural history, and contemporary life" and "mixed Cubism, Deconstruction, Mexican crosses, furniture-making techniques, Puritan spartanism, and Viennese elegance." Notable pieces included a woman posing erotically, two dancing satyrs, a Renaissance avenging angel, wood sculptures of prancing horses with white pompadours painted in high-gloss enamel, and a black-stained collapsed wooden carriage.

The Fashion Fund award committee commissioned Feinstein to create their 2010 award. She created it in the form of a swan, and for the ceremony she created 20 "one-of-a-kind" awards cast in bronze.

In January 2011 Feinstein opened her show "The Snow Queen" at Lever House in New York. It combines Carpenter Gothic architecture and Baroque painting to present vignettes of Hans Christian Andersen fairy tale "The Snow Queen". The exhibit included painted wood toy soldiers, roses, children, and ice, as well as a lacquered gold coach which was displayed outside in the snow. Vogue reviewer André Leon Talley wrote that Feinstein "explores the themes of fantasy, ruin, and beauty to create a magical universe of her own."

In February 2012 Feinstein created for a Marc Jacobs' fashion show "a twisted paper castle set", also described by Suzy Menkes as "a decayed Walt Disney castle." Feinstein referred to the work as "[R]ococo with a nasty underside".

From November 2012 to January 2013 the Gagosian Gallery held Feinstein's first exhibition in Rome, Italy. For it she created an impressionistic panoramic wallpaper of Rome covering different historical periods, painted and displayed on mirrors and accompanied by life-sized wooden sculptures inspired by depictions of early Christian saints and martyrs.

Feinstein's works have been bought by notable collectors including Aby Rosen and James Frey.

== Views ==
Feinstein and Currin's "ritzy indulgence" has been described as a "risky move" in the art world.

Feinstein told an interviewer:

The New York art world is very protective of itself [...] They don't like it when something is not in an art magazine. Dealers and collectors told me I shouldn't have been in Vogue. They feel that they have to defend you because you were photographed at some party, so it means you are not a great artist.

Both believe making art is "a consummately individual expression", a view which coincides with their libertarian political leanings, which are described as "right" of the New York art world.

Feinstein has commented on sexism in the art world. She believes that she is judged unjustly by her appearance in a way her husband and other male artists are not.

== Personal life ==
At the 1994 "Let the Artist Live" exhibition, Feinstein met John Currin. They married three years later on Valentine's Day. She and Currin have two sons and a daughter.

Feinstein has appeared in many of Currin's paintings, both as a face and as a body model. She has been called his muse.

== Exhibitions ==
=== Solo exhibitions ===
- White Room: Rachel Feinstein, White Columns, New York, NY, 1999
- Art in the Atrium, organized by Art Production Fund, Sotheby's, New York, NY, 2002
- Tropical Rodeo, Le Consortium, Dijon, France, 2006
- Rachel Feinstein, Marianne Boesky Gallery, New York, NY, 2008
- Rachel Feinstein: The Snow Queen, Lever House Art Collection, New York, NY, 2011
- Rachel Feinstein, Gagosian Gallery, Rome, Italy, 2012
- Folly, Madison Square Park Conservancy, New York, NY, 2014
- Rachel Feinstein: Secrets, Gagosian Gallery, Beverly Hills, CA, 2018
- Rachel Feinstein: Maiden, Mother Crone, Jewish Museum, New York, NY, 2019

=== Selected group exhibitions ===
- Let the Artist Live, Exit Art, New York, NY, 1994
- Greater New York, MoMA PS1, New York, NY, 2000
- John Currin and Rachel Feinstein, Hydra Workshop, Hydra, Greece, 2002
- Something About Mary, Metropolitan Opera, New York, NY, 2009
- The Little Black Dress, SCAD Museum of Art, Savannah, GA, 2012
- L’Almanach 14, Le Consortium, Dijon, France, 2014
- More Material, Salon 94, New York, NY, 2014
- No Longer / Not Yet, Minsheng Art Museum, Shanghai, China, 2015
- The Seven Ages of Woman, Performa, New York, NY, 2016
- Naturalia, Kasmin Gallery, New York, NY, 2017
- SEED, Kasmin Gallery, New York, NY, 2018
- People, Jeffrey Deitch, New York, NY, 2018
