= 1000 Nights =

2019 song by Ed Sheeran

Song by Ed Sheeran featuring Meek Mill and A Boogie wit da Hoodie

from the album No.6 Collaborations Project
- Released: 12 July 2019
- Genre: Pop; hip hop
- Length: 3:32
- Label: Asylum; Atlantic
- Songwriters: Ed Sheeran; Robert Williams; Artist Dubose; Matthew Samuels; Jahaan Sweet; Fred Gibson
- Producers: Fred Gibson; Boi-1da; Jahaan Sweet

"1000 Nights" is a song by English singer-songwriter Ed Sheeran featuring American rappers Meek Mill and A Boogie wit da Hoodie from the former's fourth studio album, No.6 Collaborations Project (2019), released through Asylum Records and Atlantic Records on 12 July 2019. The song was written by the artists alongside producers Boi-1da, Jahaan Sweet, and Fred Again.

== Background ==
Sheeran announced the collaboration, as well as the entire album's tracklist, on 18 June 2019 via Instagram. Immediately following Sheeran's announcement, Londra shared the "crazy surprise" with his fans on social media, saying: "All I can say at this moment is that dreams do come true and thank you, Ed Sheeran, for giving me the opportunity to do what I do on his album."

"1000 Nights" was written as lamentation of Ed Sheeran on his gruelling life on the road while he embarks in different cities each day.

Despite featuring explicit lyrics, it is not officially marked as such.

== Lyric video ==
A lyric video for the song was uploaded on Sheeran's YouTube account on 12 July 2019, coinciding with the album's release.

== Chart performance ==
"1000 Nights" charted at number 65 and 8 in Canada and Swedish Heatseeker Chart, respectively.

== Charts ==
Chart (2019)	Peak position
Canada Hot 100 (Billboard)	65
Swedish Heatseeker Chart	8

== Certifications ==
Region	Certification	Certified units/sales
Canada (Music Canada)	Gold	40,000^{‡}
^{‡} Sales+streaming figures based on certification alone.
