= Remember the Name (Ed Sheeran song) =

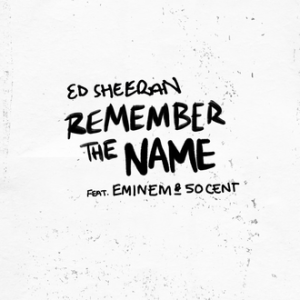

Promotional single by Ed Sheeran featuring Eminem and 50 Cent

from the album No.6 Collaborations Project
- Recorded: December 2018
- Studio: MxM (Stockholm, Sweden); Effigy (Detroit, US); Promised Land Music (London, UK)
- Genre: Pop rap
- Length: 3:27
- Label: Asylum; Atlantic
- Songwriters: Ed Sheeran; Marshall Mathers; Curtis Jackson; Karl Sandberg; Karl Schuster; Patrick Brown; Raymon Murray; Rico Wade; André Benjamin; Antwan Patton
- Producers: Max Martin; Shellback; Fred; Ed Sheeran

"Remember the Name" is a song by English singer-songwriter Ed Sheeran featuring American rappers Eminem and 50 Cent from the former's fourth album No.6 Collaborations Project (2019). It was released as a promotional single through Asylum and Atlantic Records. The song was written by the artists alongside Max Martin, Shellback, and Fred, who produced it with Sheeran; additional writing credits go to Sleepy Brown, Raymon Murra, Rico Wade, André 3000, and Big Boi, for the interpolation of Outkast's single "So Fresh, So Clean" (2001).

"Remember the Name" received generally mixed to negative reviews from music critics, who often highlighted the "Dr. Dre-inspired production", with numerous reviewers criticising Eminem and 50 Cent's verses. In 2019, Spin listed the song as being among the worst of the year. It charted in various countries, including in the top ten of New Zealand and Slovakia, and peaked at number three on the UK R&B chart. It was also certified gold by the British Phonographic Industry and platinum by Music Canada.

== Background ==
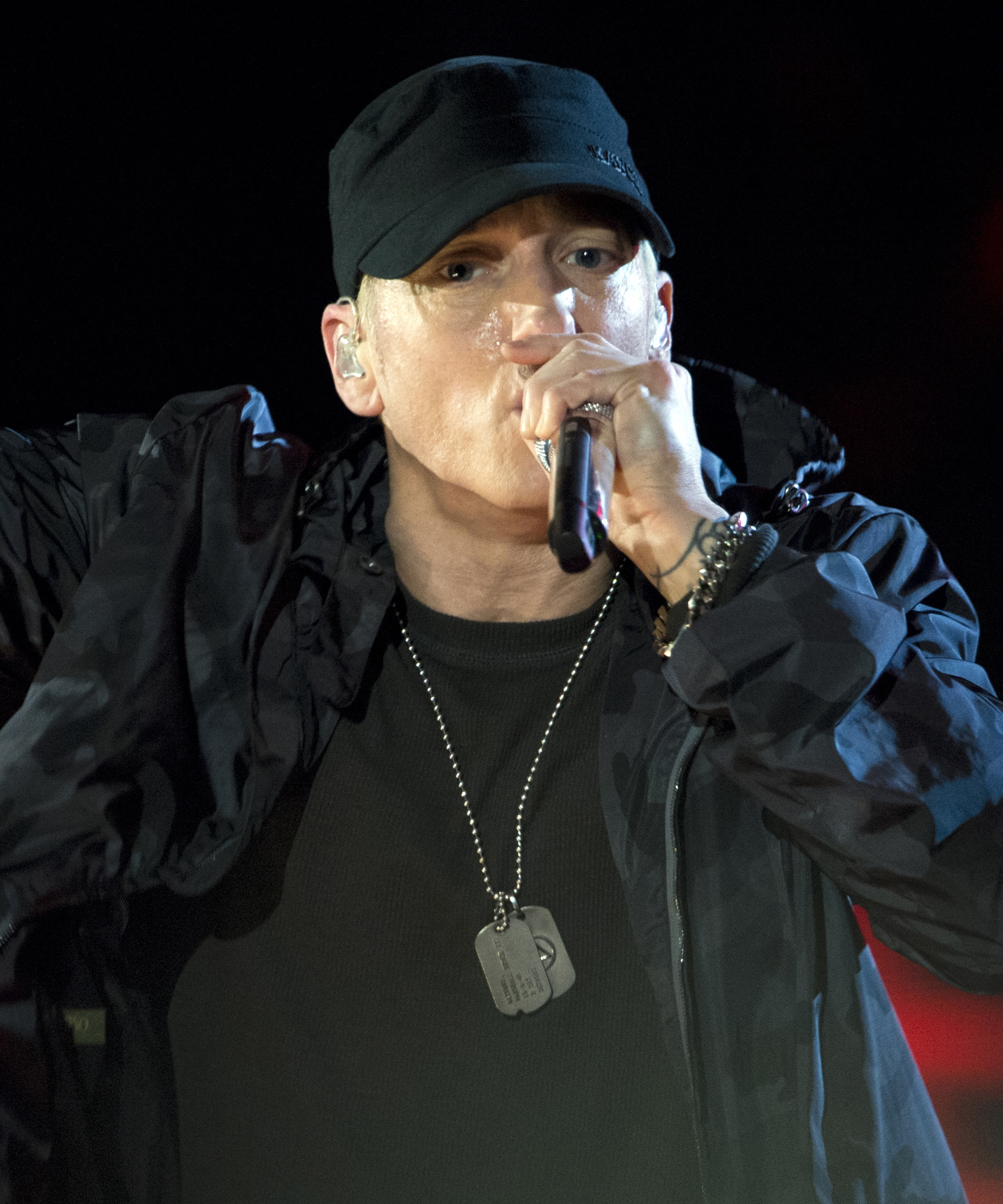
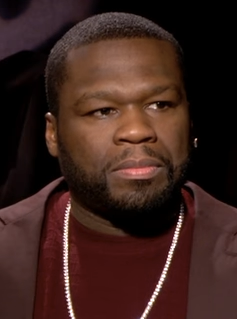
"Remember the Name" features Eminem (left) and 50 Cent (right).

In March 2016, Paul Rosenberg, Eminem's manager, asked Ed Sheeran to send song ideas for inclusion on Eminem's ninth studio album Revival (2017). Sheeran recorded a demo of the chorus of "River", with drums, guitar and piano, at Russell Crowe's studio and sent it to Rosenberg, not hearing back until May 2017. "River" was released as the second single from the album, featuring Sheeran's vocals. He told BBC News he wished to collaborate with the rapper on two tracks, an "introspective, storytelling" one and another "a nod towards the cheekier songs" on earlier Eminem albums.

According to him, "River" accomplished the former goal, so he sought the involvement of American rapper 50 Cent to create the second track. Sheeran encountered 50 Cent during a visit to Eminem's dressing room: "I walked into Eminem's dressing room and 50 Cent was in there, and I was like: this has to be meant to be". Sheeran thought that being allowed on a track with the two rappers proved that his detractors' claims that he cannot rap did not matter. "Remember the Name" was recorded in December 2018; 50 Cent recalled the following day, "I recorded a song last night with Eminem & Ed Sheeran, I had fun doing it we got some heat [sic]".

== Production ==
"Remember the Name" was produced by Max Martin, Shellback, FRED and Sheeran himself. It was co-written by the latter four along with Eminem, 50 Cent and Patrick Brown, Raymon Murra, Rico Wade, André Benjamin and Antwan Patton, the latter five received credit due to the usage of words and music from Outkast's single "So Fresh, So Clean" (2001). Martin and Shellback were in charge of programming and keyboards, while Sheeran played the guitars. FRED played drums, keyboards, guitar, bass, and was also responsible for programming the track. The song was engineered by Ky Miller and Michael Ilbert. Eminem's vocals were recorded by Mike Strange, Tony Campana and Joe Strange. "Remember the Name" was recorded at MXM Studios in Stockholm, Promised Land Music Studios in London, and Effigy Studios in Detroit. The track was mixed by Mike Strange at Effigy Studios.

== Composition and lyrical interpretation ==
"Remember the Name" is a hip hop song composed in the key of E minor with a tempo of 91 beats per minute. Sheeran "does some light rapping" on the song, while the two rappers deliver lyrics about their rise to stardom. The former raps a reference to the English town of Ipswich, by saying, "I was born a misfit / Grew up 10 miles from the town of Ipswich". He described the lyric as a "personal highlight", noting it was "funny [as] Eminem would never ever know where Ipswich is". Sheeran begins it by sing-speaking about how he was repeatedly doubted during the beginning of his career, and discouraged from rapping, "Stick to singing, stop rappin' like it's Christmas". He also talks about "drugs, fame and stature", and how he idolizes Eminem and 50 Cent. The song's instrumentation makes use of staccato guitars, pounded pianos, plucked strings and piercing synths, played over a 2001-inspired stomp-clap beat. From the hook up to the chorus, Sheeran channels the delivery and vocal stylings of American singer Nate Dogg. Eminem sings about his dislike of skinny jeans over intricate rhyme schemes and drops "finger-on-the-pulse references to his breakout single from 1999, 'My Name Is'". 50 Cent chants about his designer clothes, luxurious lifestyle and stature in the rap industry. Sheeran and 50 Cent "insist that 'it's 'bout time you remember the name.'"

== Release and reception ==
"Remember the Name" was released as the eighth track on Sheeran's fourth studio album, No.6 Collaborations Project, on 12 July 2019. The song was met with generally mixed to negative reviews from music critics. HipHop-N-More's Navjosh called it "catchy" and likened the instrumentals to the work of Dr. Dre, noting that unlike other superstar collaborations, it did not disappoint. Mitch Findlay of HotNewHipHop noted its "vintage-sounding instrumental[s]" and "nostalgic arrangement", adding that Eminem held back during his verse but had a sharp flow, and that 50 Cent showcased his charisma. Elite Daily's Jamie Leelo praised the song's lyrics and said they "might also withstand the test of time".

In a mixed review, Andrew Unterberger of Billboard thought 50 Cent's verse sounds "a little phoned-in" and Eminem's verse opts for an unnecessary amount of puns, although he praised the Dr. Dre-inspired production and Sheeran's delivery during the hook. He commended Sheeran for making his dream of collaborating with the two rappers come true, saying "It's a situation of such unreal wish-fulfilment you'd probably never even think to fantasize about it in the first place, and you can't help but smile a little bit for Sheeran that he gets to live it out". Writing for Uproxx, Aaron Williams described "Remember the Name" as "an odd patchwork of styles and concepts" and did not foresee lasting success for it despite finding it "kind of cool" in the context of the album. Bernadette Giacomazzo writing for HipHopDX felt that due to Eminem's and 50 Cent's verses, "Sheeran's presence is superfluous".

Writing for NME, Nick Levine said "Sheeran and Eminem collaborated effectively enough on 'River' (2017), but this cheesy throwback jam (which features 50 Cent for added retro vibes) almost feels like a parody". He opined that the Ipswich reference "sound[s] as though he's recruited David Brent to ghost-write his rhymes". Seth Wilson from Slant compared "Eminem's guest verse" to someone "doing a pretty good Eminem impression at a karaoke bar". He concluded, "the song is basically one big strawman boast track". Variety's Chris Willman and Clash's Malvika Padin shared a similar opinion, as they both did not enjoy the song despite the artists involved in it.

Alexis Petridis from The Guardian claimed the song did not work and that "there's something jarring about Eminem rapping about sticking nails in his eyeballs next to Sheeran repping Ipswich." The Observer's Michael Graff dubbed the track "woeful". Rawiya Kameir of Pitchfork affirmed that Sheeran was unable to rap, also claiming that both Eminem and 50 Cent were "way past their prime as rappers". Kameir concluded, "Sheeran is better off sticking within his skillset." The song was listed as one of the year's worst by Spin, and the staff said that it "offers an unusually unfettered look at the piles of generically trendy leftovers that a pop singer can compile between album cycles with an unchecked budget and incoherent vision".

== Chart performance ==
"Remember the Name" charted in various countries, including the United Kingdom, where it debuted at number one on the Official Trending Chart. The song reached number three on the UK R&B Singles chart, and was certified gold by the British Phonographic Industry. It peaked at number 57 on the US Billboard Hot 100 and reached number 22 on the Billboard Hot R&B/Hip-Hop Songs chart. In Canada, "Remember the Name" charted at number 20 and earned a platinum certification given by Music Canada. The song reached number 15 in Australia and number 10 in New Zealand. It also peaked at number nine on Slovakia's Singles Digitál Top 100, number 11 on the same chart in the Czech Republic, and number 13 in Finland. "Remember the Name" debuted at number 20 in Sweden and number 22 in Denmark, spending three weeks on each country's chart. The song also peaked at number 24 in Norway and number 29 in Germany.

== Personnel ==
Credits adapted from the liner notes of No.6 Collaborations Project.

- Ed Sheeran – vocals, guitars, songwriter, producer
- Marshall Mathers – additional vocals, songwriter
- Curtis Jackson – additional vocals, songwriter
- Karl Martin Sandberg – songwriter, programming, keyboards, producer
- Karl Johan Schuster – songwriter, programming, keyboards, producer
- FRED – drums, keyboards, guitar, bass, programming, producer
- Patrick Brown – songwriter
- Raymon Murray – songwriter
- Rico Wade – songwriter
- André Benjamin – songwriter
- Antwan Patton – songwriter
- Ky Miller – engineering
- Michael Ilbert – engineering
- Tony Campana – recording
- Joe Strange – recording
- Jaime Estalella – recording
- Mike Strange – recording, mixing

== Charts ==
Chart (2019)	Peak position
Australia (ARIA)	15
Canada Hot 100 (Billboard)	20
Czech Republic Singles Digital (ČNS IFPI)	11
Denmark (Tracklisten)	22
Finland (Suomen virallinen lista)	13
France (SNEP)	145
Germany (GfK)	29
Italy (FIMI)	84
Lithuania (AGATA)	22
Netherlands (Single Top 100)	45
New Zealand (Recorded Music NZ)	10
Norway (VG-lista)	24
Romania (Airplay 100)	68
Slovakia Singles Digital (ČNS IFPI)	9
Sweden (Sverigetopplistan)	20
UK Hip Hop/R&B (OCC)	3
US Billboard Hot 100	57
US Hot R&B/Hip-Hop Songs (Billboard)	22

== Certifications ==
Region	Certification	Certified units/sales
Austria (IFPI Austria)	Gold	15,000^{‡}
Canada (Music Canada)	Platinum	80,000^{‡}
Denmark (IFPI Danmark)	Gold	45,000^{‡}
New Zealand (RMNZ)	Platinum	30,000^{‡}
United Kingdom (BPI)	Gold	400,000^{‡}
^{‡} Sales+streaming figures based on certification alone.
