= Needy (song) =

2019 song by Ariana Grande

Song by Ariana Grande

from the album Thank U, Next
- Released: February 8, 2019
- Studio: Jungle City (New York City); The Record Plant (Hollywood)
- Genre: R&B
- Length: 2:51
- Label: Republic
- Songwriters: Ariana Grande; Victoria Monét; Tayla Parx; Tommy Brown
- Producer: Tommy Brown

Audio video
- "Needy" on YouTube

"Needy" (stylized in all lowercase) is a song by American singer Ariana Grande. It is the second track on her fifth studio album, Thank U, Next, which was released on February 8, 2019, via Republic Records. The song was written by Grande, Victoria Monét, Tayla Parx, and its producer Tommy Brown.

"Needy" reached the top 10 in Ireland, Malaysia, Singapore, and the United Kingdom; and top 20 in Australia, Canada, Lithuania, New Zealand, Portugal, and the United States. The song was certified silver by the British Phonographic Industry (BPI) and platinum by Recording Industry Association of America (RIAA).

== Background and recording ==
On October 4, 2018, Grande posted a 45-second snippet on her Instagram with the caption "tell me how good it feels to be needed". On November 5, 2018, Grande posted a second snippet alongside a video of Piggy Smallz on her Instagram Story. On November 15, Grande shared a video of her singing a part of "Needy" with a piano.

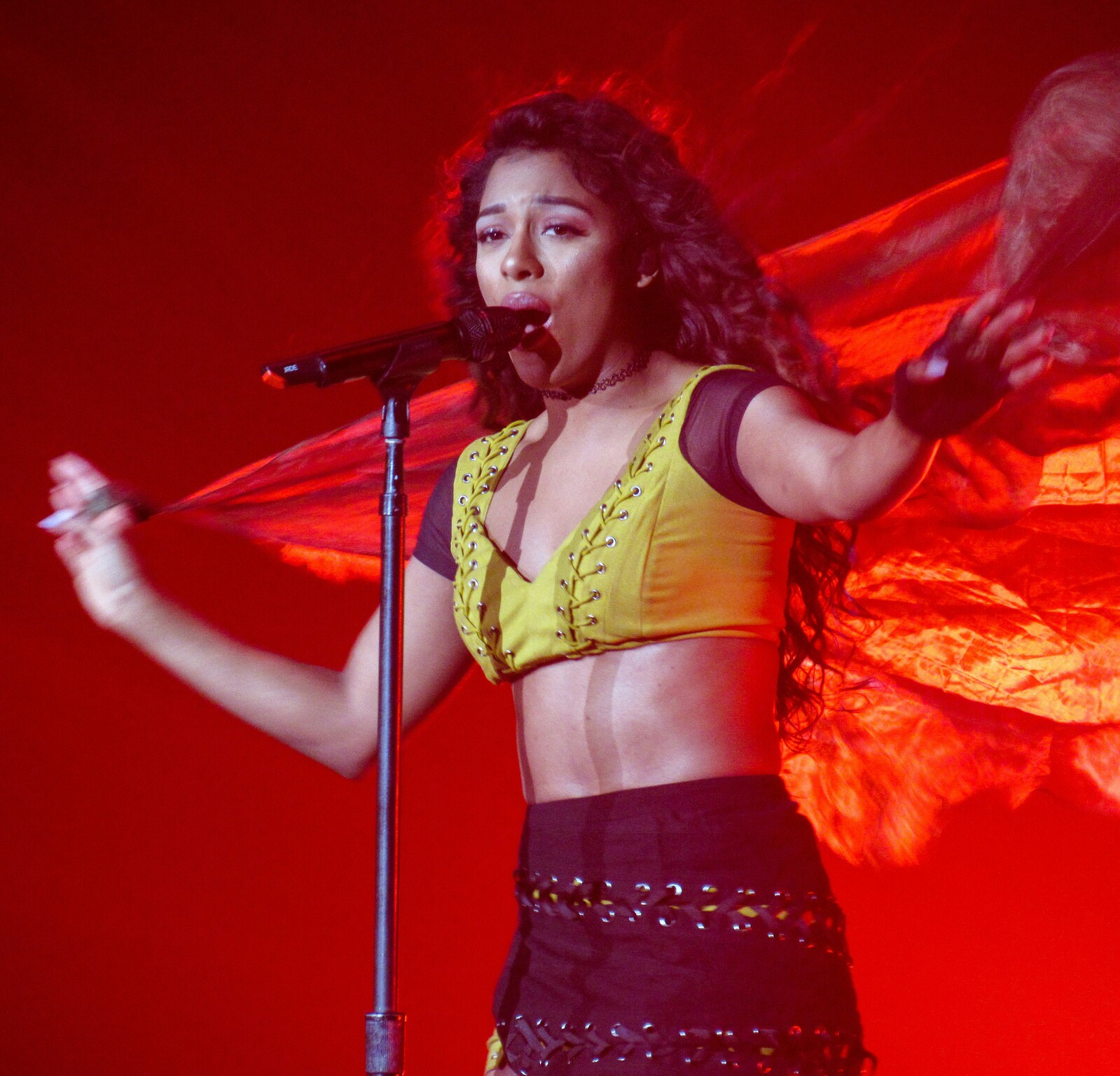
Victoria Monét (pictured in 2017) co-wrote the song and co-produced the vocals.

Needy was written by Ariana Grande, Victoria Monét, Tayla Parx and Tommy Brown, who also handled the production. Grande's vocals were recorded at the Record Plant in Holywood and Jungle City in New York City. Serban Ghenea mixed the track, and Brendan Morawski as the engineer assisted by Sean Kline.

== Critical reception ==
Callie Ahlgrim of Business Insider described "Needy" as “one of the best pop ballads in recent memory." Ross Horton from The Line of Best Fit called the song "sexy, lights-off RNB, rich and juicy in equal measure, like some of Rihanna's more sensual moments". Michael Cragg of The Guardian stated that the song "unravels like a series of confessional, self-aware text messages, the sort that aren't necessarily asking for a reply". Sal Cinquemani of Slant Magazine said that in this song that Grande is not afraid to admit that she is "needy".

== Commercial performance ==
Following the release of Thank U, Next, all 12 tracks entered within the top 50 of the US Billboard Hot 100; "Needy" debuted and peaked number 14, becoming the highest-charting non-single track from the album. On June 15, 2020, it received a platinum certification from the Recording Industry Association of America (RIAA). In the United Kingdom, the song reached number eight on the UK Singles Chart and was certified gold by the British Phonographic Industry (BPI). "Needy" debuted on several territories, peaking within the top 50 of Ireland (5), Malaysia (9), Singapore (10), New Zealand (11), Australia (13), Lithuania (14), Canada (16), Portugal (16), Slovakia (23), Latvia (30), Hungary (31), Czech Republic (39), Iceland (40), the Netherlands (41), Scotland (42), and Sweden (43), and further reaching Germany (65), Spain (69), and France (100).

== Live performances ==
Grande performed "Needy" for the first time at the 2019 iHeartRadio Music Awards. The song was part of the setlist of the Sweetener World Tour (2019).

== Credits and personnel ==
Credits adapted from Tidal.

- Ariana Grande – lead vocals, songwriter, vocal producer
- Victoria Monét – backing vocals, songwriter, vocal producer
- Tayla Parx – backing vocals, songwriter, vocal producer
- Tommy Brown – producer, songwriter, programmer
- Peter Lee Johnson – strings
- Billy Hickey – engineer
- Brendan Morawski – engineer
- John Hanes – mixing engineer
- Serban Ghenea – mixer
- Sean Klein – assistant recording engineer

== Charts ==
Chart performance for "Needy"
Chart (2019)	Peak position
Australia (ARIA)	13
Canada Hot 100 (Billboard)	16
Czech Republic Singles Digital (ČNS IFPI)	39
France (SNEP)	100
Germany (GfK)	65
Greece International (IFPI)	11
Hungary (Single Top 40)	31
Hungary (Stream Top 40)	18
Iceland (Tónlistinn)	40
Ireland (IRMA)	5
Latvia (LAIPA)	30
Lithuania (AGATA)	14
Malaysia (RIM)	9
Netherlands (Single Top 100)	41
New Zealand (Recorded Music NZ)	11
Portugal (AFP)	16
Scottish Singles Sales (Official Charts)	42
Singapore (RIAS)	10
Slovakia Singles Digital (ČNS IFPI)	23
Spain (Promusicae)	69
Sweden (Sverigetopplistan)	43
UK Singles (Official Charts)	8
US Billboard Hot 100	14

== Certifications ==
Certifications for "Needy"
Region	Certification	Certified units/sales
Australia (ARIA)	Platinum	70,000^{‡}
Brazil (Pro-Música Brasil)	2× Platinum	80,000^{‡}
France (SNEP)	Gold	100,000^{‡}
New Zealand (RMNZ)	Platinum	30,000^{‡}
United Kingdom (BPI)	Gold	400,000^{‡}
United States (RIAA)	2× Platinum	2,000,000^{‡}
^{‡} Sales+streaming figures based on certification alone.

== See also ==
- List of top 10 singles in 2019 (Ireland)
- List of UK top-ten singles in 2019
