= Antisocial (Ed Sheeran and Travis Scott song) =

2019 single by Ed Sheeran and Travis Scott

Single by Ed Sheeran and Travis Scott

from the album No.6 Collaborations Project
- Released: 12 July 2019
- Genre: Pop trap
- Length: 2:41
- Label: Asylum; Atlantic
- Songwriters: Ed Sheeran; Jacques Webster II; Fred Gibson; Joseph Saddler
- Producer: Fred Gibson

Ed Sheeran singles chronology
"Blow" and "Best Part of Me" (2019)	"Antisocial" and "South of the Border" (2019)	"Take Me Back to London" (2019)

Travis Scott singles chronology
"The London" (2019)	"Antisocial" (2019)	"Highest in the Room" (2019)

Music video
- "Antisocial" on YouTube

"Antisocial" is a song by English singer-songwriter Ed Sheeran and American rapper and singer Travis Scott. It was released on 12 July 2019 through Asylum and Atlantic Records, along with "South of the Border", as the sixth and seventh singles respectively from Sheeran's fourth studio album, No.6 Collaborations Project (2019).

== Promotion ==
"Antisocial" was announced to be the seventh track from No.6 Collaborations Project. On 11 July 2019, Sheeran announced that the song as the next single from the album and that its music video would be released on 12 July.

== Music video ==
The music video for the song was released on 12 July 2019, along with the lyric video. The video was directed by Dave Meyers and written by Matt Walton. In the video Sheeran and Scott played a number of different characters in different scenes that referenced films such as Kill Bill, The Mask, The Birds, The Martian, Edward Scissorhands, and Pulp Fiction.

== Track listing ==
Digital download
No.	Title	Length
1.	"Antisocial"	2:41

Digital download – Ghali remix
No.	Title	Length
1.	"Antisocial" (Ghali Remix)	3:46

== Credits and personnel ==
Credits adapted from Tidal.

- Ed Sheeran – vocals, songwriter
- Travis Scott – vocals, songwriter, engineer
- Grandmaster Flash – songwriter
- Fred Gibson – backing vocals, producer, songwriter, programmer, engineer, bass, drums, guitar, keyboards
- Alex Gibson – additional production
- DJ Riggins – engineer
- Jacob Richards – engineer
- Mike Seaberg – engineer
- Tre Nagella – engineer
- Jaycen Joshua – mixer
- Stuart Hawkes – masterer

== Charts ==
Chart performance for "Antisocial"
Chart (2019)	Peak position
Australia (ARIA)	11
Austria (Ö3 Austria Top 40)	15
Belgium (Ultratip Bubbling Under Flanders)	5
Belgium (Ultratip Bubbling Under Wallonia)	23
Canada Hot 100 (Billboard)	17
Czech Republic Singles Digital (ČNS IFPI)	7
Denmark (Tracklisten)	8
Estonia (Eesti Ekspress)	9
Finland (Suomen virallinen lista)	12
France (SNEP)	102
Germany (GfK)	23
Hungary (Dance Top 40)	29
Hungary (Stream Top 40)	7
Italy (FIMI)	53
Latvia (LAIPA)	4
Lithuania (AGATA)	8
Malaysia (RIM)	20
Netherlands (Single Top 100)	23
New Zealand (Recorded Music NZ)	9
Norway (VG-lista)	16
Portugal (AFP)	37
Scottish Singles Sales (Official Charts)	62
Singapore (RIAS)	11
Slovakia Singles Digital (ČNS IFPI)	10
Spain (Promusicae)	95
Sweden (Sverigetopplistan)	21
Switzerland (Schweizer Hitparade)	40
UK Hip Hop/R&B (Official Charts)	12
UK Audio Streaming (Official Charts)	8
US Billboard Hot 100	37
US Rhythmic Airplay (Billboard)	17
US Rolling Stone Top 100	32

== Certifications ==
Region	Certification	Certified units/sales
Australia (ARIA)	Gold	35,000^{‡}
Brazil (Pro-Música Brasil)	Gold	20,000^{‡}
Canada (Music Canada)	Platinum	80,000^{‡}
Denmark (IFPI Danmark)	Gold	45,000^{‡}
New Zealand (RMNZ)	Platinum	30,000^{‡}
Poland (ZPAV)	Gold	25,000^{‡}
United Kingdom (BPI)	Gold	400,000^{‡}
United States (RIAA)	Gold	500,000^{‡}
^{‡} Sales+streaming figures based on certification alone.

== Release history ==
Region	Date	Format	Version	Label	Ref.
Various	12 July 2019	Digital download; streaming	Original	Atlantic; Asylum	
Italy	12 July 2019	Contemporary hit radio	Original	Warner	
United States	13 August 2019	Rhythmic contemporary	Original	Atlantic; Asylum	
Various	6 December 2019	Digital download; streaming	Ghali remix	Atlantic; Asylum	
