= Beautiful People (Ed Sheeran song) =

2019 single by Ed Sheeran featuring Khalid

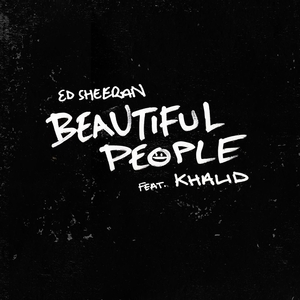

Single by Ed Sheeran featuring Khalid

from the album No.6 Collaborations Project
- Released: 28 June 2019
- Studio: MXM (Stockholm, Sweden); Mandarin Oriental (Hong Kong); Promised Land (London)
- Length: 3:17
- Label: Asylum
- Songwriters: Ed Sheeran; Fred Gibson; Max Martin; Shellback; Khalid Robinson
- Producers: Shellback; Max Martin; Fred; Ed Sheeran

Ed Sheeran singles chronology
"Cross Me" (2019)	"Beautiful People" (2019)	"Blow" / "Best Part of Me" (2019)

Khalid singles chronology
"Talk" (2019)	"Beautiful People" (2019)	"Caught Up" (2019)

Music video
- "Beautiful People" on YouTube

"Beautiful People" is a song by English singer-songwriter Ed Sheeran featuring American singer Khalid. It was released on 28 June 2019 through Asylum Records as the third single from the former's fourth studio album, No.6 Collaborations Project (2019).

It reached number one on the UK Singles Chart in July 2019, becoming the second single from the album to reach the summit of the chart. Sheeran released an acoustic solo version of the song on 15 July without Khalid. The song has reached 1 billion streams on Spotify and 315 million views on YouTube.

== Background and promotion ==
"Beautiful People" was announced as part of the tracklist for No.6 Collaborations Project (2019). Ed Sheeran revealed the song's artwork and release date on 23 June 2019. Footage of it being recorded in a studio was released in the following days leading up to its release.

== Composition ==
"Beautiful People"
20-second sample from "Beautiful People"

"Beautiful People" is composed in 4/4 time and the key of E-flat major, with a moderate R&B groove and a tempo of 96 beats per minute. It has a chord progression of Cm–E♭–A♭–Gm_{7}. Sheeran and Khalid's vocal range spans two octaves from B♭_{3} to B♭_{5}.

== Critical reception ==
NME's Nick Levine wrote that Sheeran's "skills as a pop craftsman are on full display" and the song "gives his usual everybro persona a welcome edge." Chris Willman of Variety said Sheeran and Khalid make "a good match". Bernadette Giacomazzo of HipHopDX viewed it as "one of the few tracks that actually works on the album", writing, "though they recycle old tropes, they stick to what they know best, which is just fine." Malvika Padin of Clash found the track "strong and likeable, but nothing surprising." Pitchfork's Rawiya Kameir was less impressed, calling it "heavy-handed" and "a catchy calculation appropriate for the sad-pop dominating the charts." Evening Standard reviewer Phoebe Luckhurst described the track as "Chainsmokers-esque". Lucy Shanker of Consequence regarded the song as "disingenuous".

== Music video ==
The music video for "Beautiful People" was teased a day before its 28 June release. The video included cameos of Ed Sheeran and Khalid. It was directed by Andy McLeod, and filmed in Barcelona and at the Lleida–Alguaire Airport in Catalonia, Spain.

The video opens with a couple having a vacation waiting in line with their luggage at a small airport. After being approached by a pair of airport personnel, they are directed to a long white limousine waiting outside. The couple hesitantly enters the limousine, where they eat snacks they packed and notice other fancy cars driving past them, apparently heading to the same destination.

As the video continues, the couple find themselves at a series of fancy, expensive places filled with beautiful people: a pool party beside a mansion, a yacht filled with models, a fashion show, and a house party. Surrounded by wealth, indulgence, and beauty, the couple reacts to everything with cautious interest, but spend most of their time focused on each other, following the song's theme of being true to oneself.

At the end of the video, the couple flies home on a private plane, and upon landing at the airport, they are offered a ride in a nice car. The couple decline, take hands, and head for the airport bus instead.

== Track listing ==
- Digital download and streaming
1. "Beautiful People" (featuring Khalid) – 3:17
- Digital download and streaming – Danny L Harle Harlecore Remix
1. "Beautiful People" (featuring Khalid) [Danny L Harle Harlecore Remix] – 3:45
- Digital download and streaming – NOTD Remix
1. "Beautiful People" (featuring Khalid) [NOTD Remix] – 2:42
- Digital download and streaming – Acoustic
1. "Beautiful People" (Acoustic) – 3:06
- Digital download and streaming – Jack Wins Remix
1. "Beautiful People" (featuring Khalid) [Jack Wins Remix] – 2:43

== Credits and personnel ==
Credits adapted from the liner notes of No.6 Collaborations Project

Locations

- Recorded at MXM Studios (Stockholm, Sweden), Mandarin Oriental (Hong Kong) and Promised Land Music Studios (London)
- Mixed at MixStar Studios (Virginia Beach, Virginia)
- Mastered at Metropolis Mastering (London)

Personnel

- Ed Sheeran – vocals, songwriter, producer
- Khalid – additional vocals, songwriter
- Max Martin – songwriter, producer
- Shellback – songwriter, producer, guitar, programming
- Fred – background vocals, songwriter, producer, programming, bass, drums, guitar, keys, engineer
- Alex Gibson – additional production
- Serban Ghenea – mixing
- Denis Kosiak – recording Khalid's vocals
- Joe Rubel – engineer
- John Hanes – engineer
- Michael Ilbert – engineer
- Stuart Hawkes – masterering

== Charts ==
=== Weekly charts ===
Weekly chart performance for "Beautiful People"
Chart (2019–2020)	Peak position
Australia (ARIA)	4
Austria (Ö3 Austria Top 40)	7
Belgium (Ultratop 50 Flanders)	5
Belgium (Ultratop 50 Wallonia)	4
Canada Hot 100 (Billboard)	6
China Airplay/FL (Billboard)	1
Colombia (National-Report)	95
Croatia (HRT)	3
Czech Republic Airplay (ČNS IFPI)	2
Czech Republic Singles Digital (ČNS IFPI)	3
Denmark (Tracklisten)	3
Estonia (Eesti Tipp-40)	3
Finland (Suomen virallinen lista)	2
France (SNEP)	34
Germany (GfK)	5
Global 200 (Billboard)	191
Greece (IFPI)	2
Hungary (Rádiós Top 40)	3
Hungary (Single Top 40)	10
Hungary (Stream Top 40)	4
Iceland (Tónlistinn)	3
Ireland (IRMA)	2
Italy (FIMI)	30
Japan Hot 100 (Billboard)	45
Latvia (LAIPA)	2
Lebanon (Lebanese Top 20)	3
Lithuania (AGATA)	2
Malaysia (RIM)	4
Mexico (Billboard Mexican Airplay)	18
Netherlands (Dutch Top 40)	3
Netherlands (Single Top 100)	6
New Zealand (Recorded Music NZ)	2
Norway (VG-lista)	4
Poland Airplay (ZPAV)	7
Portugal (AFP)	8
Romania (Airplay 100)	43
Russia Airplay (TopHit)	71
San Marino (SMRRTV Top 50)	4
Scottish Singles Sales (Official Charts)	5
Singapore (RIAS)	2
Slovakia Airplay (ČNS IFPI)	3
Slovakia Singles Digital (ČNS IFPI)	2
Slovenia (SloTop50)	5
Spain (Promusicae)	53
Sweden (Sverigetopplistan)	3
Switzerland (Schweizer Hitparade)	7
UK Singles (Official Charts)	1
Ukraine Airplay (TopHit)	36
US Billboard Hot 100	13
US Adult Contemporary (Billboard)	17
US Adult Pop Airplay (Billboard)	7
US Dance Airplay (Billboard)	14
US Pop Airplay (Billboard)	5
US Rolling Stone Top 100	34

=== Year-end charts ===
2019 Year-end chart performance for "Beautiful People"
Chart (2019)	Position
Australia (ARIA)	14
Austria (Ö3 Austria Top 40)	19
Belgium (Ultratop Flanders)	34
Belgium (Ultratop Wallonia)	40
Canada (Canadian Hot 100)	29
Denmark (Tracklisten)	14
France (SNEP)	133
Germany (Official German Charts)	25
Hungary (Rádiós Top 40)	61
Hungary (Stream Top 40)	14
Iceland (Tónlistinn)	14
Ireland (IRMA)	21
Italy (FIMI)	81
Latvia (LAIPA)	16
Netherlands (Dutch Top 40)	10
Netherlands (Single Top 100)	23
New Zealand (Recorded Music NZ)	19
Poland (Polish Airplay Top 100)	78
Portugal (AFP)	46
Slovenia (SloTop50)	47
Sweden (Sverigetopplistan)	23
Switzerland (Schweizer Hitparade)	23
Tokyo (Tokio Hot 100)	22
UK Singles (OCC)	21
US Billboard Hot 100	50
US Adult Top 40 (Billboard)	26
US Mainstream Top 40 (Billboard)	26

2020 Year-end chart performance for "Beautiful People"
Chart (2020)	Position
Australia (ARIA)	82
Canada (Canadian Hot 100)	53
Denmark (Tracklisten)	88
Hungary (Rádiós Top 40)	36
Iceland (Tónlistinn)	35
Netherlands (Airplay Top 50)	48
Portugal (AFP)	83
UK Singles (OCC)	58
US Adult Contemporary (Billboard)	48

== Certifications ==
Certifications for "Beautiful People"
Region	Certification	Certified units/sales
Australia (ARIA)	6× Platinum	420,000^{‡}
Austria (IFPI Austria)	2× Platinum	60,000^{‡}
Belgium (BRMA)	Platinum	40,000^{‡}
Brazil (Pro-Música Brasil)	2× Platinum	80,000^{‡}
Canada (Music Canada)	8× Platinum	640,000^{‡}
Denmark (IFPI Danmark)	3× Platinum	270,000^{‡}
France (SNEP)	Diamond	333,333^{‡}
Germany (BVMI)	Platinum	400,000^{‡}
Italy (FIMI)	2× Platinum	140,000^{‡}
New Zealand (RMNZ)	5× Platinum	150,000^{‡}
Poland (ZPAV)	3× Platinum	150,000^{‡}
Portugal (AFP)	3× Platinum	30,000^{‡}
Spain (Promusicae)	Platinum	60,000^{‡}
United Kingdom (BPI)	3× Platinum	1,800,000^{‡}
United States (RIAA)	Platinum	1,000,000^{‡}
^{‡} Sales+streaming figures based on certification alone.

== Release history ==
Release dates and formats for "Beautiful People"
Region	Date	Format	Version	Label	Ref.
Various	28 June 2019	Digital download; streaming	Original	Asylum UK	
Italy	5 July 2019	Contemporary hit radio	Original	Warner	
Various	11 July 2019	Digital download; streaming	Danny L Harle Harlecore Remix	Asylum UK	
Various	11 July 2019	Digital download; streaming	NOTD Remix	Asylum UK	
Various	16 July 2019	Digital download; streaming	Acoustic	Asylum UK	
Various	16 July 2019	Digital download; streaming	Jack Wins Remix	Asylum UK	
