= Best Part of Me =

2019 single by Ed Sheeran featuring Yebba

Single by Ed Sheeran featuring Yebba

from the album No.6 Collaborations Project
- Released: 5 July 2019
- Genre: Pop
- Length: 4:03
- Label: Asylum; Atlantic
- Songwriters: Ed Sheeran; Abbey Smith; Benjamin Levin
- Producers: Ed Sheeran; Benny Blanco; Joe Rubel

Ed Sheeran singles chronology
"Beautiful People" (2019)	"Best Part of Me" and "Blow" (2019)	"Antisocial" / "South of the Border" (2019)

Yebba singles chronology
"Don't Leave Me Lonely" (2019)	"Best Part of Me" (2019)	"Distance" (2020)

Lyric video
- "Best Part of Me" on YouTube

"Best Part of Me" is a song by English singer-songwriter Ed Sheeran featuring American singer Yebba. It was released on 5 July 2019 through Asylum and Atlantic Records, along with "Blow", as the fourth and fifth singles respectively from his fourth studio album No.6 Collaborations Project (2019).

== Background and composition ==
About working with YEBBA, Ed Sheeran stated "I loved making [the] record. YEBBA is phenomenal, she's onto massive things". "Best Part of Me" was announced as part of the tracklist for No.6 Collaborations Project (2019). Sheeran revealed the song's release date on 4 July 2019. It was released alongside "BLOW" the next day.

"Best Part of Me" is a romantic pop ballad. According to Idolator's Mike Nied, the song is a romantic ballad which "builds up to a very loved-up chorus". Spin's Rob Arcand wrote that it "slows things down", comparing it to Sheeran's solo acoustic rendition of the Justin Bieber collaboration "I Don't Care" (2019).

== Credits and personnel ==
Credits adapted from Tidal.

- Ed Sheeran – vocals, songwriter, producer, bass, guitar
- YEBBA – featured vocals, songwriter
- Benny Blanco – songwriter, producer, keyboards
- Joe Rubel – producer, engineer, keyboards
- Thomas Bartlett – keyboards
- Pino Palladino – bass
- Chris Sclafani – engineer
- Gosha Usov – engineer
- Archie Carter – assistant engineer
- Robert Sellens – assistant engineer
- Anthony Evans – editor
- Stuart Hawkes – masterer
- Mark "Spike" Stent – mixer
- Matt Wolach – mixer
- Michael Freeman – mixer

== Charts ==
Chart (2019)	Peak position
Australia (ARIA)	17
Austria (Ö3 Austria Top 40)	38
Canada Hot 100 (Billboard)	44
Czech Republic Singles Digital (ČNS IFPI)	18
Denmark (Tracklisten)	35
Estonia (Eesti Ekspress)	23
France (SNEP)	162
Germany (GfK)	55
Hungary (Single Top 40)	38
Latvia (LAIPA)	20
Lithuania (AGATA)	28
Netherlands (Single Top 100)	62
New Zealand (Recorded Music NZ)	13
Portugal (AFP)	66
Scottish Singles Sales (Official Charts)	27
Singapore (RIAS)	20
Slovakia Singles Digital (ČNS IFPI)	19
Sweden (Sverigetopplistan)	41
Switzerland (Schweizer Hitparade)	40
UK Audio Streaming (Official Charts)	18
US Billboard Hot 100	99

== Certifications ==
Region	Certification	Certified units/sales
Austria (IFPI Austria)	Gold	15,000^{‡}
Canada (Music Canada)	Platinum	80,000^{‡}
Denmark (IFPI Danmark)	Gold	45,000^{‡}
New Zealand (RMNZ)	Gold	15,000^{‡}
Poland (ZPAV)	Gold	25,000^{‡}
Portugal (AFP)	Gold	5,000^{‡}
Spain (Promusicae)	Gold	30,000^{‡}
United Kingdom (BPI)	Gold	400,000^{‡}
^{‡} Sales+streaming figures based on certification alone.

== Release history ==
Region	Date	Format	Label
Various	5 July 2019	Digital download; streaming	Asylum; Atlantic
