= Ruba Katrib =

American curator

Ruba Katrib is a Syrian-American curator of contemporary art. She has served as Curator and Director of Curatorial Affairs at MoMA PS1 since 2017. From 2012 until 2017, Katrib was Curator at SculptureCenter in New York. Prior to this post, she worked first as Assistant Curator and then as Associate Curator at the Museum of Contemporary Art in North Miami. She is best known for exhibitions highlighting women artists and global issues.

== Early life and education ==
Katrib was born in Baltimore, Maryland, and grew up in Charleston, West Virginia. She is the first US-born child of Syrian immigrant parents.

Katrib holds degrees from the School of the Art Institute of Chicago and the Center for Curatorial Studies, Bard College. In 2002, while a student at the School of the Art Institute of Chicago, she co-founded ThreeWalls, a residency and exhibition space.

== Career ==
From 2007 until 2012, Katrib worked at the Museum of Contemporary Art (MOCA), North Miami as Assistant Curator before being named Associate Curator. Among the shows Katrib curated at MOCA were solo presentations by Cory Arcangel and Claire Fontaine (both 2010), and group exhibitions including The Possibility of an Island (2008) and Convention (2009). In 2011, she organized a symposium, “New Methods,” that looked at artist-run educational platforms in Latin America. Katrib was awarded a curatorial fellowship from the Andy Warhol Foundation for the Visual Arts in 2010 to support research for “New Methods”.

Katrib became Curator at SculptureCenter in New York in 2012. At SculptureCenter, she curated the group exhibitions 74 million million million tons (2018) (co-curated with Lawrence Abu-Hamdan), The Eccentrics (2015), Puddle, pothole, portal (2014) (co-curated with Camille Henrot), Better Homes (2013), and A Disagreeable Object (2012); and solo shows of the work of Carissa Rodriguez (2018), Kelly Akashi, Sam Anderson, Teresa Burga, Cercle d’Art des Travailleurs de Plantation Congolaise (CATPC), Nicola L., Charlotte Prodger (all 2017), Rochelle Goldberg, Aki Sasamoto, Cosima von Bonin (all 2016), Anthea Hamilton, Araya Rasdjarmrearnsook, Magali Reus, Gabriel Sierra, Michael E. Smith, Erika Verzutti (all 2015), David Douard, and Jumana Manna (both 2014). With Tom Eccles she co-curated Visitors, a group exhibition of public art on Governors Island, New York in 2015.

In 2017, Katrib was named Curator at MoMA PS1. At MoMA PS1 she has curated exhibitions such as Greater New York (2021), Niki de Saint Phalle: Structures for Life (2021), Theater of Operations: The Gulf Wars 1991 - 2011 (2019) (co-curated with Peter Eleey), the retrospective Simone Fattal: Works and Days (2019), and the solo shows of Edgar Heap of Birds (2019), Karrabing Collective (2019), Fernando Palma Rodríguez, and Julia Phillips (2018). In 2018, Katrib curated prominent group invitational exhibition SITE Santa Fe and was a curatorial advisor for the Carnegie International. In 2021, Katrib was promoted to Curator and Director of Curatorial Affairs at MoMA PS1 and curated MoMA PS1's Greater New York invitational group exhibition of artists based in New York. She has served on the graduate committee at CCS Bard since 2017.

Katrib has contributed texts for a number of museum catalogues and periodicals including Art in America, Artforum, Cura Magazine, Kaleidoscope, Parkett, and Mousse. Her work is often concerned with diasporic and marginalized discourses in 21st-century artistic practices and the art world generally.

== List of Exhibitions ==
=== MoMA PS1, New York, 2017 – present ===
==== Group exhibitions ====
- Greater New York, 2021
- Theater of Operations: The Gulf Wars 1991 - 2011, co-curated with Peter Eleey, 2019

===== Monographic exhibitions =====
- Jumana Manna: Break, Take, Erase, Tally, 2022
- Niki de Saint Phalle: Structures for Life, 2021
- Simone Fattal: Works and Days, 2019
- Edgar Heap of Birds: Surviving Active Shooter Custer, 2019
- Julia Phillips: Failure Detection, 2018
- Fernando Palma Rodriguez: In Ixtli in Yollotl, We the People, 2018

=== SculptureCenter, New York, 2012 – 2017 ===
==== Group exhibitions ====
- 74 million million million tons, co-curated with Lawrence Abu-Hamdan, 2017
- The Eccentrics, 2015
- Puddle, pothole, portal, co-curated with Camille Henrot, 2014
- Better Homes, 2013
- A Disagreeable Object, 2012

==== Monographic exhibitions ====
- Carissa Rodriguez: The Maid, 2018
- Kelly Akashi: Long Exposure, 2017
- Sam Anderson: The Park, 2017
- Teresa Burga: Mano Mal Dibujada, 2017
- Cercle d’Art des Travailleurs de Plantation Congolaise (CATPC), 2017
- Nicola L.: Works, 1968 to the Present, 2017
- Charlotte Prodger: Subtotal, 2017
- Rochelle Goldberg: The Plastic Thirsty, 2016
- Aki Sasamoto: Delicate Cycle, 2016
- Cosima von Bonin: Who's Exploiting Who in the Deep Sea?, 2016
- Anthea Hamilton: Cigarette Pipes, 2015
- Araya Rasdjarmrearnsook, 2015
- Magali Reus: Spring for a Ground, 2015
- Gabriel Sierra: Numbers in a Room, 2015
- Michael E. Smith: -, 2015
- Erika Verzutti: Swan with Stage, 2015
- David Douard: )juicy o'f the nest., 2014
- Jumana Manna: Menace of Origins, 2014

=== Museum of Contemporary Art, North Miami, 2007 – 2012 ===
==== Group exhibitions ====
- The Reach of Realism, 2010
- Convention, 2009
- The Possibility of an Island, 2008
- Dark Continents, 2008

==== Monographic exhibitions ====
- Cory Arcangel: The Sharper Image, 2010
- Claire Fontaine: Economies, 2010

== Select publications ==
- “Bettina: Photographs and Works by Bettina Grossman.” Aperture, 2022.
- “Erika Verzutti: The Indiscipline of Sculpture.” KMEC Books/MASP, 2022.
- Niki de Saint Phalle: Structures for Life. MoMA PS1, 2021.
- “Neïl Beloufa: People Love War Data & Travels.” After 8 Books, 2021
- “Leidy Churchman: Crocodile.” Dancing Foxes, Hessel Museum, Bard College, 2019.
- “Molecular Sculpture.” Art in America, 2017.
- “New Methods.” Museum of Contemporary Art North Miami, 2013.
