= Yebba =

American singer (born 1995)

- Born: Abigail Elizabeth Smith; January 16, 1995 (age 31); West Memphis, Arkansas, U.S.
- Genres: R&B; pop; blue-eyed soul; gospel; neo jazz; hip hop
- Occupations: Singer; songwriter
- Years active: 2016–present
- Label: RCA
- Website: yebbasmith.com

Abigail Elizabeth Smith (born January 16, 1995), known professionally as Yebba, is an American singer and songwriter from West Memphis, Arkansas. She first became known for her YouTube channel and then for her backing vocal performance on Chance the Rapper's SNL performance of the song "Same Drugs" in 2016 and releasing her debut single "Evergreen" in 2017. She has collaborated with a number of artists, including PJ Morton, Sam Smith, Mark Ronson, Stormzy, Ed Sheeran, A$AP Rocky, Tyler, the Creator and Drake. She won a Grammy Award in the category Best Traditional R&B Performance for her feature on PJ Morton's cover of "How Deep Is Your Love" in 2019.

== Career ==
In 2017, Yebba revealed that she was co-signed by Ed Sheeran's record label Gingerbread Man Records when she performed a song called "My Mind", which was written and performed about a week before her mother died. Sheeran described how the Sofar Sounds performance of the song was so powerful, it made him cry. Shortly after followed the official release of her debut single "Evergreen". About the song, she said "I grew up doing music in my dad's church from a baby, so I've spent about a seventh of my life on the front row, beside my momma, and right behind my dad's organ. Church has always been a place of honesty, questioning, and family. So after we saw mom's suicide, and that sense of family seemingly dissolved, a building I had become entirely estranged to seemed like the only place I could go." Later that year, she collaborated with Sam Smith on the song "No Peace", which was released through Smith's 2017 album The Thrill of It All.

In 2018, she collaborated with Zane Lowe to release her debut music video for her debut single "Evergreen", which was done so with support from Apple Music and Beats 1. Lowe stated about the music video, "YEBBA is an artist in every sense of the word, and working together to bring her vision to light was truly remarkable. She has one of the more powerful and exciting voices to come along in years, and we are excited to introduce her to the world". She also appeared as a featured artist, alongside Maverick Sabre on Rudimental's promotional single "They Don't Care About Us", which served as a track from their 2019 album Toast to Our Differences. Additionally, she was a backing vocalist on the recent projects from Jess Glynne and Mumford & Sons.

In 2019, Yebba was nominated and won her first ever Grammy for Best Traditional R&B Performance of the song "How Deep Is Your Love", alongside PJ Morton at the 61st Annual Grammy Awards. She also appeared on three songs from Mark Ronson's album Late Night Feelings. In April, she appeared as a guest vocalist alongside The Staves for Mumford & Sons' live performance of the song "Beloved" on The Jonathan Ross Show. In June, she was revealed to have a featured appearance on Ed Sheeran's collaborative effort No.6 Collaborations Project on a song entitled "Best Part of Me", which was eventually released as a promotional single. The song became her first charted release, peaking at 99 in the US Charts. In August, she released her follow up single to "Evergreen", entitled "Where Do You Go". The song was produced by BJ Burton and The Picard Brothers.

In May 2020, Yebba signed to RCA Records and released her first single, the Mark Ronson produced "Distance".

In September 2021, Yebba appeared on the highly anticipated album Certified Lover Boy by Drake on a song entitled "Yebba's Heartbreak". The song serves as the album's interlude. A week later, she would release her debut album Dawn, featuring artists A$AP Rocky and Smino.

On March 6, 2026, Yebba released her second album Jean which contains 14 tracks.

== Personal life ==
Yebba has been an outspoken advocate for mental health awareness and support. Her mother died by suicide about a week after Yebba sang her first original song, causing "My Mind" to take on new meaning representing mental health, she wrote this as a way to share her experiences with as many people as possible. She says her artist name was chosen to honor her mother, who she said "always called her by the nickname" (her name Abbey written backwards) as a child. In memory of her mother, Yebba gave the song away free through her website. Smith attended Belmont University in Nashville, Tennessee.

== Artistry ==
Yebba cites The Clark Sisters as her heroes and number one influences. She wrote on Instagram: "This family's music made me come to know Jesus. Anything I've learned about singing has been from trying to mimic them." Records like "Nothing to Lose", "Jesus Lifted Me", "You Brought the Sunshine", "The Darkest Hour Is Just Before the Day" and "Jesus Is a Love Song" are some of her favorites.

== Discography ==
=== Studio albums ===
Title	Album details	Peak chart positions
Title	Album details	US Heat.
Dawn	Released: September 10, 2021; Label: RCA; Format: CD, digital download, streaming	6
Jean	Released: March 6, 2026; Label: RCA; Format: CD, digital download, streaming	—

=== Singles ===
==== As lead artist ====
Title	Year	Peak chart positions					Certifications	Album
Title	Year	US	AUS	CAN	SWE	WW	Certifications	Album
"Evergreen"	2017	—	—	—	—	—	RMNZ: Platinum	Non-album singles
"Where Do You Go"	2019	—	—	—	—	—		Non-album singles
"Distance"	2020	—	—	—	—	—		Dawn
"My Mind"	2021	—	—	—	—	—		Non-album singles
"The Past and Pending"	2021	—	—	—	—	—		Non-album singles
"October Sky"	2021	—	—	—	—	—		Dawn
"Louie Bag" (featuring Smino)	2021	—	—	—	—	—		Dawn
"Boomerang"	2021	—	—	—	—	—		Dawn
"All I Ever Wanted"	2021	—	—	—	—	—		Dawn
"Waterfall (I Adore You)" (featuring Sweata)	2023	—	—	—	—	—		Non-album single
"Die Trying" (with PartyNextDoor and Drake)	2025	21	40	14	— (Note: "Die Trying" did not enter the Swedish Singellista Chart, but peaked at number 8 on the Swedish Heatseeker Chart.)	32	RIAA: Platinum; BPI: Silver; MC: 2× Platinum; RMNZ: Gold	Some Sexy Songs 4 U
"Yellow Eyes"	2026	—	—	—	—	—		Jean
"—" denotes a recording that did not chart or was not released in that territory.

==== As featured artist ====
List of singles as featured artist, with selected chart positions, certifications and album name
Title	Year	Peak chart positions									Certifications	Album
Title	Year	US	AUS	CAN	DEN	FRA	GER	NZ	SWE	UK	Certifications	Album
"They Don't Care About Us" (Rudimental featuring Maverick Sabre and Yebba)	2018	—	—	—	—	—	—	—	—	—		Toast to Our Differences
"Don't Leave Me Lonely" (Mark Ronson featuring Yebba)	2019	—	—	—	—	—	—	—	—	58	BPI: Silver	Late Night Feelings
"Best Part of Me" (Ed Sheeran featuring Yebba)	2019	99	17	44	35	162	55	13	41	—	BPI: Gold; MC: Gold; RMNZ: Gold	No.6 Collaborations Project
"Cold Shoulder" (Drake featuring Don Toliver and Yebba)	2026	18	82	7	—	—	—	3	—	36		Habibti (FOMO)
"—" denotes a recording that did not chart or was not released in that territory.

=== Other charted songs ===
List of singles as featured artist, with selected chart positions, certifications and album name
Title	Year	Peak chart positions						Certifications	Album
Title	Year	US	AUS	CAN	FRA	SWE	WW	Certifications	Album
"No Peace" (with Sam Smith)	2017	—	—	100	—	83	—	RMNZ: Gold	The Thrill of It All
"Yebba's Heartbreak" (with Drake)	2021	24	38	43	94	—	24	ARIA: Platinum; BPI: Gold; RMNZ: Platinum	Certified Lover Boy
"—" denotes a recording that did not chart or was not released in that territory.

=== Other featured appearances ===
Year	Title	Album
2015	"Gravity" (Clark Beckham featuring Yebba)	Non-album single
2015	"Smoke" (Luke Levenson featuring Yebba)	Non-album single
2016	"Melatonin" (A Tribe Called Quest featuring Yebba and Marsha Ambrosius)	We Got It from Here... Thank You 4 Your Service
2018	"How Deep Is Your Love" (Live) (PJ Morton featuring Yebba)	Gumbo Unplugged
2018	"My Day Will Come" (James Francies featuring Yebba)	Flight
2019	"Knock Knock Knock" (Mark Ronson featuring Yebba)	Late Night Feelings
2019	"When U Went Away" (Mark Ronson featuring Yebba)	Late Night Feelings
2019	"Fuck Yo Feelings" (Robert Glasper featuring Yebba)	Fuck Yo Feelings
2019	"Don't Leave Me Lonely" (Acoustic Version) (Mark Ronson featuring Yebba and James Francies)	Non-album single
2019	"Don't Forget to Breathe (Interlude)" (Stormzy featuring Yebba)	Heavy Is the Head
2021	"How Much Can A Heart Take" (Lucky Daye featuring Yebba)	Table For Two
2022	"Over" (Robert Glasper featuring Yebba)	Black Radio III
2026	"Difference" (Denzel Curry and Kenneth Blume featuring Yebba)	ii

=== Guest appearances ===
List of guest backing appearances for other performing artists, showing year released and album name
Year	Title	Other artist(s)	Album
2018	"Broken"	Jess Glynne	Always in Between
2018	"42", "Beloved", "October Skies", "Rose of Sharon"	Mumford & Sons	Delta
2019	"Money"	Michael Kiwanuka, Tom Misch	TBA
2019	"Spinning"	Mark Ronson, Ilsey	Late Night Feelings
2025	"I’ll Take Care of You”	Tyler, the Creator	Don't Tap the Glass

=== Songwriting credits ===
Year	Artist	Album	Song	Co-written with
2018	Brasstracks	For Those Who Know, Pt. 2	"Improv #2 (Intro)"	Ivan Jackson, Conor Rayne, Richard Saunders, Elliot Skinner, Benjamin Lusher, Robert Glasper, Randy Vargas, Conor Szymanski
2019	Rudimental	Toast to Our Differences	"Leave It for Tomorrow" (featuring Elli Ingram)	Amir Izadkhah, Piers Aggett, Kesi Dryden, Leon "DJ Locksmith" Rolle

== Awards and nominations ==
Year	Award	Artist/work	Category	Result	Ref.
2019	Grammy Awards	"How Deep Is Your Love" (PJ Morton featuring Yebba)	Best Traditional R&B Performance	Won	
2021	Grammy Awards	"Distance"	Best Traditional R&B Performance	Nominated	
2022	Grammy Awards	"How Much Can a Heart Take" (Lucky Daye featuring Yebba)	Best Traditional R&B Performance	Nominated	
2022	Pop Awards	Yebba	Emerging Artist of the Year	Won	
