= South of the Border (Ed Sheeran song) =

2019 single by Ed Sheeran featuring Camila Cabello and Cardi B

Single by Ed Sheeran featuring Camila Cabello and Cardi B

from the album No.6 Collaborations Project
- Language: English; Spanish
- Released: 12 July 2019
- Recorded: June 2019
- Studio: Rokstone Studios (London); Henson Recording Studios (Los Angeles, CA); Glenwood Recording Studios (Burbank, CA); Promised Land Music Studios (London)
- Genre: Latin pop; hip hop; R&B
- Length: 3:24
- Label: Asylum; Atlantic
- Songwriters: Ed Sheeran; Camila Cabello; Belcalis Almanzar; Fred Gibson; Jordan Thorpe; Steve Mac
- Producers: Ed Sheeran; Fred Gibson; Steve Mac

Ed Sheeran singles chronology
"Blow" / "Best Part of Me" (2019)	"South of the Border" and "Antisocial" (2019)	"Take Me Back to London" (2019)

Camila Cabello singles chronology
"Señorita" (2019)	"South of the Border" (2019)	"Shameless" / "Liar" (2019)

Cardi B singles chronology
"Press" (2019)	"South of the Border" (2019)	"Yes" (2019)

Music video
- "South of the Border" on YouTube

"South of the Border" is a song by English singer Ed Sheeran featuring American singer Camila Cabello and American rapper Cardi B. It was released on 12 July 2019 through Asylum and Atlantic Records, along with "Antisocial", as the sixth and seventh singles respectively from Sheeran's fourth studio album, No.6 Collaborations Project (2019).

The song was written by the artists alongside Pardison Fontaine, Steve Mac, and Fred Again, with the latter two producing it with Sheeran. It reached the top ten in eight countries and is certified Gold or higher in fifteen countries.

== Background ==
"South of the Border" was initially released as the second track of Ed Sheeran's compilation album No. 6 Collaborations Project. In September 2019, Sheeran's manager, Stuart Camp, replied to a fan's tweet on Twitter, suggesting that it would be his next single. A few days later, Sheeran posted a picture of the exchange on an Instagram story. On 28 September, Cabello posted a poster for the music video.

== Composition ==
Musically, "South of the Border" is a three-minute and twenty-four-second long Latin pop song. In terms of music notation, "South of the Border" was composed using 4/4 common time in the key of D minor, with a tempo of 98 beats per minute. Sheeran, Cabello, and Cardi B's vocals range from the low note F_{3} to the high note of G_{5}.

== Music video ==
On 12 July 2019, the lyric video for "South of the Border" was released on Sheeran's YouTube channel. The official music video for the song was released on 4 October, also on Sheeran's YouTube channel. In the music video, Sheeran plays Teddy Fingers, Cabello plays Mariposa, and Cardi B appears as herself alongside model Alexis Ren as Scarlet Jones and actor Paul Karmiryan as Agent X. As of May 2024, it has received over 250 million views.

== Commercial performance ==
In the United Kingdom, the song debuted at No. 40 on the UK Singles Chart. It later climbed the chart and reached its peak at No. 4 on the chart issue dated 25 October 2019, becoming Sheeran's twenty-sixth top 10, Cabello's fourth, and Cardi B's fourth. It's also Cardi B's second highest-charting song in the UK, after her number one single "WAP". On 10 January 2020, the song was certified platinum by BPI for surpassing sales of 600,000 units in the United Kingdom.

In the United States, the song debuted at No. 53 on the Billboard Hot 100 and No. 14 on Rolling Stone Top 100 when it became available to download and stream with the release of the album in the United States. It received 10.2 million streams in the first week it was available to streaming services, according to Rolling Stone. Following its release as a single, the track re-entered the Hot 100 at No. 100. It rose to a new peak of No. 49, while reaching a high position of No. 16 on the Mainstream Top 40 chart. It also reached No. 16 on the Billboard Digital Song Sales chart. On 9 December 2019, the song was certified gold by the RIAA for surpassing sales of 500,000 units in the United States.

The song also debuted in the top 15 on official charts in Australia, Canada, New Zealand, Singapore, Slovakia and Sweden.

== Credits and personnel ==
Credits adapted from the liner notes of No.6 Collaborations Project.

Publishing

- Published by Ed Sheeran Limited and Sony/ATV Music Publishing (UK) Limited, Rokstone Music Limited administered under exclusive license to Universal Music Publishing Limited, Promised Land Music Ltd. / Universal Music Publishing Ltd., Milamoon Songs BMI published by Syco admin. by Sony ATV, Washpoppin Inc/Sony ATV Tunes LLC (ASCAP) and Sony/ATV Songs LLC (BMI). Used by permission. All rights reserved.
- Camila Cabello appears courtesy of Syco / Epic Records, a division of Sony Music Entertainment
- Cardi B appears courtesy of KSR / Atlantic Recording Corporation

Recording

- Mixed at Mixstar Studios, Virginia Beach, Virginia
- Recorded at Rokstone Studios, London; Henson Studios, Los Angeles, California; Glenwood Recording Studios, Burbank, California; and Promised Land Music Studios, London

Personnel

- Ed Sheeran – vocals, songwriter, producer, guitar
- Camila Cabello – featured vocals, songwriter
- Cardi B – featured vocals, songwriter
- Fred Gibson – songwriter, producer, bass, drums, keyboards
- Steve Mac – songwriter, producer, keyboards, synthesizer
- Pardison Fontaine – songwriter
- Evan LaRay – engineer
- John Hanes – engineer
- Simone Torres – engineer
- Stuart Hawkes – mastering
- Serban Ghenea – mixing
- Chris Laws – programming

== Track listing ==
Digital download
No.	Title	Length
1.	"South of the Border" (featuring Camila Cabello and Cardi B)	3:24

Digital download – Cheat Codes remix
No.	Title	Length
1.	"South of the Border" (featuring Camila Cabello and Cardi B) (Cheat Codes remix)	3:15

Digital download – Sam Feldt remix
No.	Title	Length
1.	"South of the Border" (featuring Camila Cabello and Cardi B) (Sam Feldt remix)	2:53

Digital download – Acoustic
No.	Title	Length
1.	"South of the Border" (featuring Camila Cabello) (acoustic)	3:14

== Charts ==
=== Original version ===
==== Weekly charts ====
Chart (2019–2020)	Peak position
Australia (ARIA)	12
Austria (Ö3 Austria Top 40)	38
Belgium (Ultratop 50 Flanders)	36
Belgium (Ultratop 50 Wallonia)	22
Brazil (Top 100 Brasil)	98
Canada Hot 100 (Billboard)	14
Canada AC (Billboard)	39
Canada CHR/Top 40 (Billboard)	8
Canada Hot AC (Billboard)	15
CIS Airplay (TopHit)	141
Croatia (HRT)	6
Czech Republic Airplay (ČNS IFPI)	7
Czech Republic Singles Digital (ČNS IFPI)	10
Denmark (Tracklisten)	18
Estonia (Eesti Ekspress)	13
Euro Digital Songs (Billboard)	12
Finland (Suomen virallinen lista)	7
France (SNEP)	75
Germany (GfK)	33
Greece (IFPI Greece)	16
Hungary (Rádiós Top 40)	7
Hungary (Single Top 40)	21
Hungary (Stream Top 40)	11
Iceland (Tónlistinn)	23
Ireland (IRMA)	6
Israel (Media Forest)	4
Italy (FIMI)	52
Latvia (LAIPA)	12
Lithuania (AGATA)	23
Mexico (Billboard Ingles Airplay)	10
Netherlands (Dutch Top 40)	9
Netherlands (Single Top 100)	14
New Zealand (Recorded Music NZ)	14
Norway (VG-lista)	13
Poland Airplay (ZPAV)	22
Portugal (AFP)	33
Romania (Airplay 100)	13
San Marino (SMRRTV Top 50)	19
Scottish Singles Sales (Official Charts)	11
Singapore (RIAS)	9
Slovakia Airplay (ČNS IFPI)	3
Slovakia Singles Digital (ČNS IFPI)	8
Slovenia (SloTop50)	13
Spain (PROMUSICAE)	61
Sweden (Sverigetopplistan)	14
Switzerland (Schweizer Hitparade)	19
UK Singles (Official Charts)	4
US Billboard Hot 100	49
US Adult Contemporary (Billboard)	28
US Adult Pop Airplay (Billboard)	13
US Dance Club Songs (Billboard)	3
US Dance Airplay (Billboard)	22
US Pop Airplay (Billboard)	16
US Rolling Stone Top 100	14
Venezuela Anglo (Record Report)	27
Venezuela Pop (Record Report)	45

==== Year-end charts ====
Chart (2019)	Position
Australia (ARIA)	54
Canada (Canadian Hot 100)	87
Ireland (IRMA)	50
Netherlands (Dutch Top 40)	69
Netherlands (Single Top 100)	99
UK Singles (OCC)	55

Chart (2020)	Position
Australia (ARIA)	90
Hungary (Rádiós Top 40)	42
Romania (Airplay 100)	42
Switzerland (Schweizer Hitparade)	86
UK Singles (OCC)	77
US Adult Top 40 (Billboard)	43

=== Cheat Codes remix ===
Chart (2019)	Peak position
New Zealand Hot Singles (RMNZ)	20

== Certifications ==
Region	Certification	Certified units/sales
Australia (ARIA)	4× Platinum	280,000^{‡}
Austria (IFPI Austria)	Platinum	30,000^{‡}
Belgium (BRMA)	Gold	20,000^{‡}
Brazil (Pro-Música Brasil)	Platinum	40,000^{‡}
Canada (Music Canada)	6× Platinum	480,000^{‡}
Denmark (IFPI Danmark)	2× Platinum	180,000^{‡}
France (SNEP)	Platinum	200,000^{‡}
Germany (BVMI)	Gold	200,000^{‡}
Italy (FIMI)	Platinum	70,000^{‡}
New Zealand (RMNZ)	4× Platinum	120,000^{‡}
Poland (ZPAV)	2× Platinum	100,000^{‡}
Portugal (AFP)	Platinum	10,000^{‡}
Spain (Promusicae)	Platinum	60,000^{‡}
United Kingdom (BPI)	2× Platinum	1,200,000^{‡}
United States (RIAA)	Gold	500,000^{‡}
^{‡} Sales+streaming figures based on certification alone.

== Release history ==
Region	Date	Format	Version	Label	Ref.
Various	12 July 2019	Digital download; streaming	Original	Atlantic; Asylum	
Australia	12 July 2019	Contemporary hit radio	Original	Atlantic; Asylum	
Various	27 September 2019	Digital download; streaming	Cheat Codes remix	Atlantic; Asylum	
United Kingdom	4 October 2019	Contemporary hit radio	Original	Atlantic; Asylum	
Various	11 October 2019	Digital download; streaming	Sam Feldt remix	Atlantic; Asylum	
Italy	18 October 2019	Contemporary hit radio	Original	Warner	
Italy	18 October 2019	Contemporary hit radio	Cheat Codes remix	Warner	
Italy	18 October 2019	Contemporary hit radio	Sam Feldt remix	Warner	
Various	29 November 2019	Digital download; streaming	Acoustic	Atlantic; Asylum	
Italy	29 November 2019	Contemporary hit radio	Acoustic	Warner	
Italy	29 November 2019	Contemporary hit radio	No rap version	Warner	
United States	3 December 2019	Contemporary hit radio	Original	Atlantic	
