= Greater New York (art exhibition) =

Contemporary art exhibition in Queens

- Location: Long Island City, Queens, New York, United States

Greater New York is a quinquennial survey of emerging artists working in New York City organized by MoMa PS1 in Long Island City, Queens, New York. The first edition took place in 2000, with subsequent versions mounted every five years.

Greater New York originally emerged out of the merger between PS1 Contemporary Art Center and the Museum of Modern Art, which took place over the course of 10 years, from 2000 to 2010.

== Editions ==
- Greater New York 2000
- Greater New York 2005 (Klaus Biesenbach, Glenn Lowry, Ann Temkin, Bob Nickas, Alanna Heiss, Amy Smith-Stewart)
- Greater New York 2010 (Klaus Biesenbach, Connie Butler, Neville Wakefield)
- Greater New York 2015 (T. Lax, Mia Locks, Peter Eeley, Douglas Crimp)
- Greater New York 2021 (Ruba Katrib, Serubiri Moses, Kate Fowle, Inés Katzenstein)
- Greater New York 2025 (Jody Graf, Connie Butler, Elena Ketelsen González, Kari Rittenbach, Sheldon Gooch, Andrea Sánchez, Ruba Katrib)

== History ==
The P.S.1 Contemporary Art Center had been founded by Alana Heiss in 1976 as the outgrowth of an alternative arts organization she founded with architecture/theater critic Brendan Gill called The Institute for Art and Urban Resources, which at the time renovated abandoned buildings in New York City. Heiss opened the P.S.1 Contemporary Art Center in a deserted Romanesque Revival public school building, which significantly increased the organization's exhibition and studio capacity. In 2000, as the merger began, representatives from both institutions curated the inaugural edition of the survey together, stating "It is the result of a fastpaced experiment in collaboration: in a matter of months the selection and installation of Greater New York was executed by a team of curators from P.S.1. and The Museum of Modern Art."

The initial version in 2000 took place from an open call, with 150 artists selected out of 2,000 applicants.

In 2005, the opening of its second edition coincided with a commercial art fair, prompting one critic, Peter Eleey to write that the survey had “no way of separating itself from the market's engorged desire for some institutional guidance among the sea of young artists now plying their wares.” Eleey would go on to become the associate director of the museum and a co-curator of the fourth edition.

The 2015 edition took a more historical approach, showing artists such as Henry Flynt, Scott Burton, Charles Atlas, Su Friedrich, and Peter Saul alongside younger artists such as Jamian Juliano-Villani and Ajay Kurian.

The 5th edition was slated to take place in 2020, but was post-poned to 2021 due to the Covid-19 pandemic and lockdown.

== Notable Artists ==
- Yuji Agematsu
- Cecily Brown
- Paul Pffeifer
- Dana Schutz
- Tauba Auerbach
- Bruce High Quality Foundation
- Charles Atlas
- Sharon Hayes
- Liz Magic Laser
- Rosemary Mayer
- Carolyn Lazard
- Emilie Louise Gossiaux
- Rotimi Fani-Kayode
