= Cross Me =

2019 single by Ed Sheeran featuring Chance the Rapper and PnB Rock

Single by Ed Sheeran featuring Chance the Rapper and PnB Rock

from the album No.6 Collaborations Project
- Released: 24 May 2019
- Genre: Pop; R&B; alternative R&B
- Length: 3:26
- Label: Atlantic
- Songwriters: Ed Sheeran; Chancellor Bennett; Rakim Allen; Fred Again
- Producer: Fred Again

Ed Sheeran singles chronology
"I Don't Care" (2019)	"Cross Me" (2019)	"Beautiful People" (2019)

Chance the Rapper singles chronology
"Groceries" (2019)	"Cross Me" (2019)	"Bad Idea" (2019)

PnB Rock singles chronology
"I Like Girls" (2019)	"Cross Me" (2019)	"Leave Em Alone" (2019)

Music video
- "Cross Me" on YouTube

"Cross Me" is a song by English singer-songwriter Ed Sheeran featuring American rappers Chance the Rapper and PnB Rock. It released on 24 May 2019 through Atlantic Records as the second single from the former's fourth studio album, No.6 Collaborations Project (2019).

== Background and promotion ==
Ed Sheeran revealed the song name on 20 May 2019, crossing out the two featured artists' names, challenging fans to guess who they were. He hinted at the featured artists by wearing a Chance the Rapper hat and a PnB Rock backpack. He also gave a clue of the release date by stating that he had "more new stuff" coming soon.

PnB Rock's vocals are included via sampling of his song "Pressure" from the album Catch These Vibes, specifically from the audiotape of a 2017 XXL video in which he gave a freestyled performance of "Pressure". A music video focusing on the lyrics was released on 21 June 2019.

== Credits and personnel ==
Credits adapted from Tidal.

- Ed Sheeran – lead vocals, writer
- Chance the Rapper – featured vocals, writer
- PnB Rock – featured vocals, writer
- Fred Again – backing vocals, producer, writer, programming, keyboards, guitar, bass, drums, engineering
- PARISI – synthesizers, designing
- Gabe Jaskowiak – recording
- Manny Marroquin – mixing
- Chris Galland – mix engineering
- Robin Florent – assistant mix engineering
- Scott Desmarais – assistant mix engineering

== Charts ==
=== Weekly charts ===
Chart (2019)	Peak position
Australia (ARIA)	5
Austria (Ö3 Austria Top 40)	18
Belgium (Ultratip Bubbling Under Flanders)	1
Belgium (Ultratip Bubbling Under Wallonia)	1
Canada Hot 100 (Billboard)	12
Czech Republic Singles Digital (ČNS IFPI)	14
Denmark (Tracklisten)	9
Estonia (Eesti Ekspress)	6
Finland (Suomen virallinen lista)	8
France (SNEP)	86
Germany (GfK)	23
Hungary (Single Top 40)	12
Hungary (Stream Top 40)	6
Ireland (IRMA)	6
Italy (FIMI)	45
Japan Hot 100 (Billboard)	69
Latvia (LAIPA)	5
Lebanon (Lebanese Top 20)	3
Lithuania (AGATA)	9
Netherlands (Dutch Top 40)	30
Netherlands (Single Top 100)	37
New Zealand (Recorded Music NZ)	6
Norway (VG-lista)	15
Poland Airplay (ZPAV)	41
Portugal (AFP)	30
Romania (Airplay 100)	80
Scotland Singles (Official Charts)	11
Slovakia Airplay (ČNS IFPI)	13
Slovakia Singles Digital (ČNS IFPI)	9
Spain (Promusicae)	76
Sweden (Sverigetopplistan)	13
Switzerland (Schweizer Hitparade)	21
UK Singles (Official Charts)	4
US Billboard Hot 100	25
US Adult Pop Airplay (Billboard)	33
US Dance Airplay (Billboard)	34
US Pop Airplay (Billboard)	14
US Rhythmic Airplay (Billboard)	15
US Rolling Stone Top 100	17

=== Year-end charts ===
Chart (2019)	Position
Australia (ARIA)	55
Canada (Canadian Hot 100)	83
Denmark (Tracklisten)	51
Latvia (LAIPA)	66
UK Singles (Official Charts Company)	44

== Certifications ==
Region	Certification	Certified units/sales
Australia (ARIA)	3× Platinum	210,000^{‡}
Austria (IFPI Austria)	Gold	15,000^{‡}
Canada (Music Canada)	3× Platinum	240,000^{‡}
Denmark (IFPI Danmark)	Platinum	90,000^{‡}
New Zealand (RMNZ)	2× Platinum	60,000^{‡}
Poland (ZPAV)	Platinum	50,000^{‡}
Portugal (AFP)	Gold	5,000^{‡}
United Kingdom (BPI)	Platinum	600,000^{‡}
United States (RIAA)	Gold	500,000^{‡}
^{‡} Sales+streaming figures based on certification alone.

== Release history ==
Region	Date	Format	Label	Ref.
Various	24 May 2019	Digital download; streaming	Atlantic	
United Kingdom	25 May 2019	Contemporary hit radio	Atlantic	
United States	8 June 2019	Contemporary hit radio	Atlantic	
