= Bernadette Giacomazzo =

American journalist and author (born 1977)

Bernadette Giacomazzo (born Benedetta Rosalia Giuseppina Giacomazzo, 29 November 1977) is an American journalist, author, and publicist. She has had bylines in Teen Vogue, People, Us Weekly, The Los Angeles Times, and The New York Post.

== Early life and education ==
Giacomazzo is the oldest of two children, born in Far Rockaway, New York. Her father, Giuseppe Giacomazzo, was part of the Marseilles Mafia. Her mother, Anna Maria Natalucci, is the daughter of chef Paolo Natalucci, who had a number of restaurants in New York City in the 1960s and 1970s. She was raised in New York.

Giacomazzo completed her secondary education at Our Lady of Mercy Academy in Syosset, New York in 1995. She attended Duquesne University, where she earned a Bachelor of Arts degree in biology and classics in 1999. She later pursued graduate-level humanities studies at Hofstra University, completing her master’s degree in 2002.

== Career ==
=== Early career in journalism and media ===
Giacomazzo began writing while in college, contributing to online music and entertainment publications In Music We Trust and The Indie Journal. After graduating, she returned to New York and worked in legal and media-related roles while continuing to write for The Island Ear, a Long Island-based music publication. Following the closure of The Island Ear, she interned at Astralwerks Records, where she participated in radio and promotional campaigns for electronic music artists including Basement Jaxx and The Chemical Brothers.

In 2001, Giacomazzo became assistant editor at The Inside Connection, a Long Island entertainment magazine. She also worked in radio production at WLIR-FM. By the mid-2000s, worked as an instructor at Nassau Community College and as a guest lecturer at Hofstra University. In 2005, she became news editor of GO! NYC Magazine.

In 2006, Giacomazzo signed with Splash News as a professional photographer, covering red carpet events, concerts, and entertainment industry assignments. From 2009 to approximately 2013, she served as Executive Editor of LatinTRENDS Magazine, where she oversaw editorial direction.

In 2012, Giacomazzo became Eye Candy Editor at XXL Magazine. She continued contributing to digital media platforms including BET, BuzzFeed, Yahoo and FanSided.

=== Digital media and corporate roles ===
Giacomazzo worked at Blavity, where she later served in a senior SEO management capacity. Her work has focused on content optimization, audience growth strategy, and digital media performance.

Giacomazzo has written on entertainment, culture, sports, wellness, and business topics for Complex and Men's Journal. Her editorial work for Men's Journal includes coverage of entertainment industry developments, cultural commentary, and feature reporting on public figures, media trends, and consumer-facing entertainment news.

Giacomazzo is the founder and chief executive of G-Force Marketing & Publicity (formerly Akasha Multimedia), a media and communications firm.

=== Film and television ===
In 2009, Giacomazzo music supervisor on independent films Winter of Frozen Dreams and Rivers Wash Over Me. She appeared in 50 Cent’s “O.J.” music video. She later worked as head of unit publicity on projects such as Stakeout (2019).

== Books and publications ==
Giacomazzo is the co-author of Swimming with Sharks: A Real-World Guide to Success (and Failure) in the Business of Music, which focuses on music industry business practices. She is also the author of The Uprising dystopian fiction series, beginning with The Gathering. Additional nonfiction works include cultural history titles published by academic and trade publishers, including In Living Color: A Cultural History and The Golden Girls: A Cultural History, both part of a broader television studies series.

== Personal life ==
Giacomazzo is based in the Greater New York City area. She is multilingual, with fluency in English, Italian, and Spanish. She has publicly described herself as a long-term vegetarian and an advocate for animal and human rights.

Giacomazzo has lived in New York, Los Angeles, Miami, and Las Vegas, as well as Italy.
