= Jumpers for Goalposts: Live at Wembley Stadium =

Video by Ed Sheeran
- Released: 13 November 2015
- Recorded: 10–12 July 2015
- Venue: Wembley Stadium (London)
- Genres: Pop; hip hop; soul; R&B
- Length: 85:00
- Labels: Asylum; Atlantic
- Director: Paul Dugdale

Jumpers for Goalposts: Live at Wembley Stadium is a home video by English singer-songwriter Ed Sheeran, released on Blu-ray on 13 November 2015. It features the footage taken from Sheeran's x Tour, when he became the first solo artist to take the stage (without a band) at Wembley Stadium in London and played across three sold out nights to a crowd of 240,000 people. Jumpers for Goalposts: Live at Wembley Stadium features performances of hits like "The A Team", "Sing" or "Thinking Out Loud". Sir Elton John duets with Sheeran on two songs.

The title "Jumpers for Goalposts" alludes to street/park football in the UK, a practice where jumpers would be placed on the ground and used as goalposts, a nod from Sheeran playing the concerts at Wembley Stadium, the home of English football. Aside from the live performances, Jumpers for Goalposts: Live at Wembley Stadium gives viewers an insight into life backstage on the road with Sheeran. Simultaneously, Jumpers for Goalposts: Live at Wembley Stadium was released on DVD as part of the re-release of Sheeran's 2014 x album. This CD/DVD combo titled x (Wembley Edition) also includes five new tracks on the CD portion.

== Track listing ==
No.	Title	Writer(s)	Length
1.	"I'm a Mess"	Ed Sheeran	5:12
2.	"Lego House"	Sheeran; Jake Gosling; Chris Leonard	4:03
3.	"Photograph"	Sheeran; Johnny McDaid	5:19
4.	"Bloodstream"	Sheeran; McDaid; Gary Lightbody; Kesi Dryden; Piers Aggett; Leon Rolle	6:00
5.	"Don't/No Diggity/Nina"	Sheeran; Benjamin Levin	7:25
6.	"I See Fire"	Sheeran	6:16
7.	"Don't Go Breaking My Heart" (duet with Elton John)	Ann Orson; Carte Blanche	5:24
8.	"Thinking Out Loud"	Sheeran; Amy Wadge	5:41
9.	"The A Team"	Sheeran	5:21
10.	"You Need Me, I Don't Need You"	Sheeran	4:40
11.	"Sing"	Sheeran; Pharrell Williams	4:55

Extras
No.	Title	Writer(s)	Length
12.	"Afire Love" (duet with Elton John)	Sheeran; McDaid; Foy Vance	6:15
13.	"Drunk"	Sheeran; Gosling	4:19
14.	"Tenerife Sea"	Sheeran; McDaid; Vance	5:01
15.	"Take It Back/Superstition" (medley)	Sheeran; McDaid; Stevie Wonder	6:58

== Charts ==
=== Weekly charts ===
Chart (2015–16)	Peak position
Australian Music DVD (ARIA)	6
Dutch Music DVD (MegaCharts)	6
French Music DVD (SNEP)	16
German Albums (Offizielle Top 100)	90
Hungarian Albums (MAHASZ)	36
Japanese Blu-ray (Oricon)	114
Italian Music DVD (FIMI)	3
Swedish Music DVD (Sverigetopplistan)	9
Swiss Music DVD (Schweizer Hitparade)	9
UK Music Videos (Official Charts)	4

=== Year-end charts ===
Chart (2015)	Position
Australia Music DVD (ARIA)	36

== Release history ==
Region	Date	Format	Label	Catalog
Europe	13 November 2015	Blu-ray	Asylum; Atlantic	825646017287
Japan	18 November 2015	Blu-ray	Asylum; Atlantic	825646017287
Australia	20 November 2015	Blu-ray	Asylum; Atlantic	825646017287
