= X Tour (Ed Sheeran) =

2014–15 concert tour by Ed Sheeran

x Tour
- World tour by Ed Sheeran
- Promotional poster example
- Location: Asia; Europe; North America; Oceania; South America
- Associated album: ×
- Start date: 6 August 2014
- End date: 12 December 2015
- Legs: 13
- No. of shows: 180
- Box office: US$150.7 million ($204.69 million in 2025 dollars)

Ed Sheeran concert chronology
- + Tour (2011–13); x Tour (2014–15); ÷ Tour (2017–19)

The x Tour (pronounced the "Multiply Tour") was the second world concert tour by the English singer-songwriter and musician, Ed Sheeran, in support of his second studio album, × (pronounced "multiply") (2014). The tour began in Osaka, Japan on 6 August 2014, and continued through Europe, the Americas, Oceania and Asia until 12 December 2015, where the tour ended in New Zealand. Sheeran planned 180 shows. In June 2015, the singer announced a documentary would be filmed during the tour's three sold-out dates, 10–12 July 2015, at 80,000-person capacity Wembley Stadium.

== Background ==
Throughout 2013, Sheeran supported Taylor Swift on her North American Red Tour, as well as performing throughout the show itself. He also is featured on her single, "Everything Has Changed", which was promoted at the Summertime Ball and the final of Britain's Got Talent. While touring, he began recording his second studio album, ×. The album was preceded by the lead single, "Sing", which reached number one in the UK. The album, released on 20 June 2014, received critical acclaim, and Sheeran performed at series of festivals in 2014, including Glastonbury Festival, T in the Park and Southside Festival. On 14 April 2014, following a performance on Saturday Night Live, Sheeran announced his first ever North American arena tour. Beginning in Seattle, the 15-date tour would travel all around North America. Due to demand, three dates were added to the tour (one date at the SAP Center and at the Staples Center in Los Angeles).

During the 2015 leg of the X Tour, Ed Sheeran chose to use a Fender Stratocaster loaned to him by British contemporary artist Teddy McDonald. The guitar known as Green T featuring graphics by the artist was played in 18 countries and used for the songs requiring an electric guitar including "Thinking Out Loud". Green T was returned to Teddy McDonald at the end of the X Tour and later auctioned by Bonhams for £12,500 (Dec 2015).

The documentary movie Jumpers for Goalposts: Live at Wembley Stadium shot at Wembley Stadium at the end of the X Tour features the graffiti'd Fender Stratocaster Ed Sheeran commissioned as a collaboration between New York street art pioneer John Crash Matos and Teddy McDonald. Known as the 'Crash x Teddy M' Stratocaster, the guitar features the debut of the Teddy M Heart design and Crash's signature eye symbol. GQ magazine featured a full-page article on the 'Crash x Teddy M' Stratocaster in their July 2015 edition.

According to Pollstar, the X Tour was the 43rd highest-grossing tour of 2014, with 667,066 tickets sold and US$33.4 million grossed. The next year, the X Tour became the seventh highest-grossing tour of 2015, with 1,823,410 tickets sold and a gross of US$117.3 million, accumulating a total of US$150.7 million grossed.

The support acts were: Rudimental, Rixton, Foy Vance, Kodaline and Christina Perri.

== Set list ==
This set list is representative of the show on 27 August 2014. It does not represent all concerts for the duration of the tour.

1. "I'm a Mess"
2. "Lego House"
3. "Don't"
4. "Drunk"
5. "Take It Back"
6. "One"
7. "Bloodstream"
8. "Tenerife Sea"
9. "Afire Love"
10. "Runaway"
11. "Thinking Out Loud"
12. "Give Me Love"
13. "I See Fire"
14. ;Encore
15. "You Need Me, I Don't Need You"
16. "The A Team"
17. "Chasing Cars"
18. "Sing"

== Tour dates ==
List of 2014 concerts, showing date, city, country, venue, tickets sold, number of available tickets and amount of gross revenue
Date	City	Country	Venue	Attendance	Revenue
15 August 2014 (Note: The show of 15 August 2014 in Hasselt at Kiewit was part of the Pukkelpop.)	Hasselt	Belgium	Kiewit	—N/a	—N/a
16 August 2014 (Note: The show of 16 August 2014 in Chelmsford at Hylands Park was part of the V Festival.)	Chelmsford	England	Hylands Park	—N/a	—N/a
17 August 2014 (Note: The show of 17 August 2014 in Weston-under-Lizard at Weston Park was part of the V Festival.)	Weston-under-Lizard	England	Weston Park	—N/a	—N/a
21 August 2014	Seattle	United States	WaMu Theater	7,200 / 7,200	$404,362
23 August 2014	Vancouver	Canada	Ambleside Park	10,768 / 10,768	$567,979
26 August 2014	San Jose	United States	SAP Center	7,485 / 7,485	$423,475
27 August 2014	Los Angeles	United States	Staples Center	13,220 / 13,220	$600,422
29 August 2014	Las Vegas	United States	The Chelsea	6,000 / 6,000	$237,415
30 August 2014	Las Vegas	United States	The Chelsea	6,000 / 6,000	$237,415
31 August 2014	Glendale	United States	Jobing.com Arena	8,918 / 8,918	$329,272
3 September 2014	Kansas City	United States	Sprint Center	5,514 / 5,514	$285,408
4 September 2014	Cleveland	United States	Wolstein Center	5,139 / 5,139	$272,367
6 September 2014	Columbia	United States	Merriweather Post Pavilion	11,563 / 11,563	$507,170
8 September 2014	Philadelphia	United States	Wells Fargo Center	10,723 / 10,723	$523,115
9 September 2014	Mansfield	United States	Xfinity Center	10,808 / 10,808	$545,623
11 September 2014	Charlotte	United States	Time Warner Cable Arena	6,533 / 6,533	$314,548
12 September 2014	Duluth	United States	Arena at Gwinnett Center	9,276 / 9,276	$475,402
13 September 2014	Nashville	United States	Bridgestone Arena	10,231 / 10,231	$569,296
15 September 2014	Minneapolis	United States	Target Center	8,434 / 8,434	$428,111
16 September 2014	Rosemont	United States	Allstate Arena	10,532 / 10,532	$532,328
17 September 2014	Auburn Hills	United States	The Palace of Auburn Hills	6,419 / 6,419	$340,873
18 September 2014	Toronto	Canada	Air Canada Centre	14,156 / 14,156	$774,975
20 September 2014 (Note: The show of 20 September 2014 in Las Vegas at the MGM Grand Garden Arena was part of the 2014 iHeartRadio Music Festival.)	Las Vegas	United States	MGM Grand Garden Arena	—N/a	—N/a
29 September 2014 (Note: The show of 29 September 2014 in London at the Roundhouse was part of the 2014 iTunes Festival.)	London	England	The Roundhouse	—N/a	—N/a
3 October 2014	Dublin	Ireland	3Arena	51,332 / 51,332	$2,763,200
4 October 2014	Dublin	Ireland	3Arena	51,332 / 51,332	$2,763,200
5 October 2014	Dublin	Ireland	3Arena	51,332 / 51,332	$2,763,200
6 October 2014	Dublin	Ireland	3Arena	51,332 / 51,332	$2,763,200
8 October 2014	Belfast	Northern Ireland	Odyssey Arena	20,330 / 20,648	$1,072,258
9 October 2014	Belfast	Northern Ireland	Odyssey Arena	20,330 / 20,648	$1,072,258
11 October 2014	Leeds	England	First Direct Arena	12,808 / 12,810	$671,052
12 October 2014	London	England	The O_{2} Arena	68,748 / 70,368	$4,049,785
13 October 2014	London	England	The O_{2} Arena	68,748 / 70,368	$4,049,785
14 October 2014	London	England	The O_{2} Arena	68,748 / 70,368	$4,049,785
15 October 2014	London	England	The O_{2} Arena	68,748 / 70,368	$4,049,785
18 October 2014	Birmingham	England	National Indoor Arena	13,520 / 13,812	$720,042
19 October 2014	Birmingham	England	LG Arena	29,329 / 29,926	$1,566,933
20 October 2014	Birmingham	England	LG Arena	29,329 / 29,926	$1,566,933
22 October 2014	Nottingham	England	Capital FM Arena	—N/a	—N/a
23 October 2014	Nottingham	England	Capital FM Arena	—N/a	—N/a
25 October 2014	Newcastle	England	Metro Radio Arena	10,817 / 11,153	$570,467
27 October 2014	Manchester	England	Phones 4u Arena	32,303 / 32,610	$1,703,744
28 October 2014	Manchester	England	Phones 4u Arena	32,303 / 32,610	$1,703,744
30 October 2014	Glasgow	Scotland	SSE Hydro	25,408 / 25,408	$1,340,085
31 October 2014	Glasgow	Scotland	SSE Hydro	25,408 / 25,408	$1,340,085
3 November 2014	Amsterdam	Netherlands	Ziggo Dome	16,114 / 16,300	$699,760
4 November 2014	Brussels	Belgium	Forest National	8,274 / 8,400	$301,572
5 November 2014	Düsseldorf	Germany	ISS Dome	11,820 / 12,164	$415,868
6 November 2014	Hamburg	Germany	O_{2} World Hamburg	11,843 / 11,843	$416,677
11 November 2014	Copenhagen	Denmark	Forum Copenhagen	—N/a	—N/a
12 November 2014	Stockholm	Sweden	Ericsson Globe	13,994 / 13,994	$606,446
14 November 2014	Berlin	Germany	Max-Schmeling-Halle	8,969 / 8,969	$316,025
15 November 2014	Stuttgart	Germany	Porsche-Arena	6,283 / 6,283	$228,751
17 November 2014	Munich	Germany	Olympiahalle	12,084 / 12,084	$482,649
18 November 2014	Frankfurt	Germany	Festhalle Frankfurt	11,739 / 11,742	$413,018
19 November 2014	Zürich	Switzerland	Maag Halle	—N/a	—N/a
20 November 2014	Milan	Italy	Alcatraz	—N/a	—N/a
22 November 2014	Villeurbanne	France	Le Transbordeur	—N/a	—N/a
24 November 2014	Barcelona	Spain	Palau Sant Jordi	—N/a	—N/a
25 November 2014	Madrid	Spain	Barclaycard Center	—N/a	—N/a
27 November 2014	Paris	France	Bataclan Theatre	—N/a	—N/a

List of 2015 concerts, showing date, city, country, venue, tickets sold, number of available tickets and amount of gross revenue
Date	City	Country	Venue	Attendance	Revenue
26 January 2015	Rome	Italy	PalaLottomatica	7,138 / 7,138	$277,334
27 January 2015	Milan	Italy	Mediolanum Forum	10,144 / 10,144	$443,392
28 January 2015	Zürich	Switzerland	Hallenstadion	13,000 / 13,000	$813,776
30 January 2015	Amnéville	France	Galaxie Amnéville	11,032 / 12,470	$375,049
1 February 2015	Cournon-d'Auvergne	France	Zénith d'Auvergne	6,586 / 7,570	$207,979
2 February 2015	Paris	France	Zénith Paris	6,073 / 6,073	$219,176
3 February 2015	Nantes	France	Zénith de Nantes	8,223 / 8,470	$259,674
12 February 2015	Prague	Czech Republic	Tipsport Arena	—N/a	—N/a
13 February 2015	Warsaw	Poland	Torwar Hall	—N/a	—N/a
15 February 2015	Vilnius	Lithuania	Siemens Arena	—N/a	—N/a
16 February 2015	Riga	Latvia	Arena Riga	—N/a	—N/a
17 February 2015	Tallinn	Estonia	Saku Suurhall	—N/a	—N/a
27 February 2015	Muscat	Oman	Shangri-La's Barr Al Jissah; Resort and Spa	3,000 / 3,000	$180,000
1 March 2015	Mumbai	India	Mahalaxmi Racecourse	7,700 / 8,000	$307,384
3 March 2015	Doha	Qatar	Qatar National Convention Centre	6,000 / 6,000	$359,610
5 March 2015	Dubai	United Arab Emirates	Dubai Media City	10,000 / 10,000	$891,490
7 March 2015	Shanghai	China	Mercedes-Benz Arena	7,160 / 7,160	$619,386
8 March 2015	Seoul	South Korea	SK Olympic Handball Gymnasium	3,296 / 3,977	$407,507
10 March 2015	Hong Kong		AsiaWorld–Expo	7,869 / 7,869	$689,894
12 March 2015	Manila	Philippines	Mall of Asia Arena	10,408 / 10,408	$982,382
14 March 2015	Singapore		The Star Performing Arts Centre	4,985 / 4,985	$477,756
16 March 2015	Kuala Lumpur	Malaysia	Plenary Hall	4,694 / 4,699	$385,611
20 March 2015	Brisbane	Australia	Riverstage	27,928 / 27,928	$1,808,894
21 March 2015	Brisbane	Australia	Riverstage	27,928 / 27,928	$1,808,894
22 March 2015	Brisbane	Australia	Riverstage	27,928 / 27,928	$1,808,894
24 March 2015	Sydney	Australia	Qantas Credit Union Arena	36,545 / 36,545	$2,515,310
25 March 2015	Sydney	Australia	Qantas Credit Union Arena	36,545 / 36,545	$2,515,310
26 March 2015	Sydney	Australia	Qantas Credit Union Arena	36,545 / 36,545	$2,515,310
28 March 2015	Melbourne	Australia	Rod Laver Arena	39,382 / 39,382	$2,550,923
29 March 2015	Melbourne	Australia	Rod Laver Arena	39,382 / 39,382	$2,550,923
30 March 2015	Melbourne	Australia	Rod Laver Arena	39,382 / 39,382	$2,550,923
1 April 2015	Adelaide	Australia	Adelaide Entertainment Centre Arena	18,318 / 18,318	$1,159,194
2 April 2015	Adelaide	Australia	Adelaide Entertainment Centre Arena	18,318 / 18,318	$1,159,194
4 April 2015	Perth	Australia	Perth Arena	29,276 / 29,692	$1,968,703
5 April 2015	Perth	Australia	Perth Arena	29,276 / 29,692	$1,968,703
8 April 2015	Christchurch	New Zealand	Horncastle Arena	8,868 / 8,868	$656,842
10 April 2015	Wellington	New Zealand	TSB Bank Arena	5,635 / 5,635	$417,375
11 April 2015	Auckland	New Zealand	Vector Arena	23,279 / 23,792	$1,572,724
12 April 2015	Auckland	New Zealand	Vector Arena	23,279 / 23,792	$1,572,724
19 April 2015	Bogotá	Colombia	C.C Bima Gran Carpa	6,630 / 6,630	$495,906
21 April 2015	Lima	Peru	Jockey Club Parcela H	11,649 / 11,649	$828,144
23 April 2015	Santiago	Chile	Pista Atletica	14,797 / 14,797	$762,840
25 April 2015	Buenos Aires	Argentina	Estadio Luna Park	15,884 / 15,884	$968,061
26 April 2015	Buenos Aires	Argentina	Estadio Luna Park	15,884 / 15,884	$968,061
28 April 2015	São Paulo	Brazil	Espaço das Américas	14,823 / 14,823	$857,542
29 April 2015	São Paulo	Brazil	Espaço das Américas	14,823 / 14,823	$857,542
30 April 2015	Rio de Janeiro	Brazil	HSBC Arena	11,245 / 11,245	$674,568
2 May 2015 (Note: The show of 2 May 2015 in New Orleans at Fair Grounds Race Course was part of the New Orleans Jazz & Heritage Festival.)	New Orleans	United States	Fair Grounds Race Course	—N/a	—N/a
3 May 2015 (Note: The show of 3 May 2015 in Memphis at Tom Lee Park was part of the Beale Street Music Festival.)	Memphis	United States	Tom Lee Park	—N/a	—N/a
6 May 2015	Austin	United States	Frank Erwin Center	11,593 / 11,951	$683,306
7 May 2015	Grand Prairie	United States	Verizon Theatre	6,010 / 6,010	$418,431
9 May 2015	Tulsa	United States	BOK Center	12,230 / 12,230	$681,958
10 May 2015	St. Louis	United States	Scottrade Center	—N/a	—N/a
12 May 2015	Pittsburgh	United States	Consol Energy Center	13,389 / 13,389	$754,355
13 May 2015	Albany	United States	Times Union Center	11,022 / 12,935	$654,538
19 May 2015	Salt Lake City	United States	EnergySolutions Arena	12,328 / 12,638	$727,498
23 May 2015	Uncasville	United States	Mohegan Sun Arena	7,090 / 7,090	$464,890
24 May 2015	Bangor	United States	Darling's Waterfront Pavilion	12,816 / 13,160	$660,282
26 May 2015	Philadelphia	United States	The Mann Center	12,498 / 12,868	$706,561
28 May 2015	New York City	United States	Forest Hills Stadium	26,214 / 27,330	$1,785,832
29 May 2015	New York City	United States	Forest Hills Stadium	26,214 / 27,330	$1,785,832
30 May 2015	Newark	United States	Prudential Center	13,007 / 13,007	$971,881
31 May 2015	Brooklyn	United States	Barclays Center	14,341 / 14,609	$1,083,905
2 June 2015	Montreal	Canada	Bell Centre	14,494 / 14,931	$825,978
3 June 2015	Ottawa	Canada	Canadian Tire Centre	13,343 / 13,808	$697,184
5 June 2015	London	Canada	Budweiser Gardens	8,849 / 8,849	$543,515
6 June 2015	Toronto	Canada	Air Canada Centre	14,278 / 14,278	$801,167
7 June 2015	Hopewell	United States	Marvin Sands Performing Arts Center	14,175 / 14,175	$513,708
9 June 2015	Des Moines	United States	Wells Fargo Arena	13,120 / 13,408	$772,430
10 June 2015	Sioux Falls	United States	Denny Sanford Premier Center	10,455 / 10,868	$625,543
12 June 2015	Winnipeg	Canada	MTS Centre	11,443 / 11,443	$670,526
13 June 2015	Regina	Canada	Brandt Centre	5,986 / 6,092	$377,279
14 June 2015	Edmonton	Canada	Rexall Place	12,814 / 12,814	$780,998
16 June 2015	Saskatoon	Canada	SaskTel Centre	12,080 / 12,289	$710,903
17 June 2015	Calgary	Canada	Scotiabank Saddledome	12,953 / 13,201	$807,531
19 June 2015	Vancouver	Canada	Rogers Arena	13,425 / 13,854	$821,993
20 June 2015	Portland	United States	Moda Center	12,476 / 12,476	$744,538
23 June 2015	San Diego	United States	Valley View Casino Center	10,272 / 12,382	$569,320
24 June 2015	Los Angeles	United States	Hollywood Bowl	—N/a	—N/a
25 June 2015	Los Angeles	United States	Hollywood Bowl	—N/a	—N/a
26 June 2015	Berkeley	United States	Hearst Greek Theatre	8,500 / 8,500	$552,500
29 June 2015	Morrison	United States	Red Rocks Amphitheatre	18,259 / 19,050	$1,082,783
30 June 2015	Morrison	United States	Red Rocks Amphitheatre	18,259 / 19,050	$1,082,783
2 July 2015	Noblesville	United States	Klipsch Music Center	—N/a	—N/a
3 July 2015 (Note: The show of 3 July 2015 in Milwaukee at Marcus Amphitheater was part of Summerfest.)	Milwaukee	United States	Marcus Amphitheater	—N/a	—N/a
10 July 2015	London	England	Wembley Stadium	229,725 / 229,725	$18,008,988
11 July 2015	London	England	Wembley Stadium	229,725 / 229,725	$18,008,988
12 July 2015	London	England	Wembley Stadium	229,725 / 229,725	$18,008,988
24 July 2015	Dublin	Ireland	Croke Park	162,208 / 162,208	$11,713,029
25 July 2015	Dublin	Ireland	Croke Park	162,208 / 162,208	$11,713,029
3 September 2015	Houston	United States	BBVA Compass Stadium	22,414 / 23,765	$1,243,692
5 September 2015	Frisco	United States	Toyota Stadium	30,665 / 30,665	$1,571,889
8 September 2015	Orlando	United States	Amway Center	13,940 / 13,940	$925,691
9 September 2015	Miami	United States	American Airlines Arena	13,146 / 13,146	$876,272
10 September 2015	Tampa	United States	Amalie Arena	12,598 / 13,288	$747,953
12 September 2015	Atlanta	United States	Philips Arena	13,551 / 13,551	$834,508
13 September 2015	Nashville	United States	Bridgestone Arena	15,754 / 15,754	$905,096
15 September 2015	Saint Paul	United States	Xcel Energy Center	14,561 / 14,561	$965,621
16 September 2015	Tinley Park	United States	Hollywood Casino Amphitheatre	21,252 / 28,630	$877,976
17 September 2015	Cincinnati	United States	Riverbend Music Center	20,267 / 20,372	$776,555
18 September 2015	Cuyahoga Falls	United States	Blossom Music Center	19,546 / 19,546	$749,267
20 September 2015	Toronto	Canada	Air Canada Centre	14,404 / 14,404	$848,120
22 September 2015	Washington, D.C.	United States	Verizon Center	25,909 / 27,814	$1,535,022
23 September 2015	Washington, D.C.	United States	Verizon Center	25,909 / 27,814	$1,535,022
25 September 2015	Foxborough	United States	Gillette Stadium	51,996 / 54,000	$3,234,377
26 September 2015 (Note: The 26 September 2015 performance at Central Park in New York City was part of the Global Citizen Festival.)	New York City	United States	Central Park	—N/a	—N/a
28 November 2015	Brisbane	Australia	Suncorp Stadium	45,452 / 45,452	$2,813,173
2 December 2015	Perth	Australia	HBF Park	31,816 / 31,816	$2,156,006
5 December 2015	Melbourne	Australia	AAMI Park	67,353 / 67,353	$4,407,403
6 December 2015	Melbourne	Australia	AAMI Park	67,353 / 67,353	$4,407,403
9 December 2015	Sydney	Australia	Allianz Stadium	47,617 / 47,617	$2,980,584
12 December 2015	Auckland	New Zealand	Mount Smart Stadium	43,201 / 43,201	$2,537,456
