= Runaway (Ed Sheeran song) =

Song by Ed Sheeran

from the album x
- Released: 20 June 2014
- Genre: Acoustic hip hop
- Length: 3:25
- Label: Asylum; Atlantic
- Songwriters: Ed Sheeran; Pharrell Williams
- Producer: Pharrell Williams

"Runaway" is a song written by English singer-songwriter Ed Sheeran and American rapper and singer Pharrell Williams then it was recorded by the former for his second studio album, x (2014) which appeared as the ninth track. The song was produced solely by Pharrell Williams.

== Background ==
"Runaway" is the ninth track as well as the second and final track from the album that is produced by Pharrell Williams (the other being "Sing"). Described as "finger-clicking", it draws from the same influence, the sound of Justin Timberlake's debut album, that "Sing" does. Sheeran intended for the song to feature on a future project with Pharrell, but it was put on the album when he was persuaded to include "Sing".

== Lyrics ==
The lyrics of the song describes Sheeran who no longer is able to put up with the problems of his father and decides to run away with a girl to escape the toxic environment he once called home.

Planning to leave in the early hours of the morning with his packed necessities, he intended to flee to London to pursue his music career - an act he has followed through with at the age of 16.

"Runaway wasn't even going to go on the record, it was just a cool jam I was going to use for a project down the line. I played it to Elton John and he said 'That's on your record right?' and I said 'No' and he told me I was an idiot, so it's on the record."

== Critical reception ==
In a Billboard track-by-track review, writer Jason Lipshutz stated: "The sassy soul of "Runaway" sounds like the perfection of the idea John Newman hatched on "Cheating," but the looped vocal snippet is Sheeran's specialty. This one is going to pop when presented live."

== Composition ==
"Runaway" is written in the key of G-sharp minor with the tempo of 95 BPM.

== Credits and personnel ==
Credits adapted from x album liner notes:

- Ed Sheeran – lead vocals, acoustic guitar, electric guitar, instrumentation, songwriting
- Pharrell Williams – production and songwriting
- Johnny McDaid – guitars, bass, backing vocals, percussion, piano
- Jeff Bhasker – production, piano and keys
- Geoff Swan – engineering
- Mark "Spike" Stent – mixing
- Ruadhri Cushnan – mixing
- Stuart Hawkes – mastering
- Coco Arquette – additional vocals
- Andrew Coleman – recording, digital editing and arrangement
- Courteney Cox – additional vocals
- Eamon Harkin – additional vocals
- Emile Haynie – additional production
- Ramon Rivas – recording assistant
- Rob Sucheki – recording assistant

== Charts ==
Chart (2014)	Peak position
UK Singles (Official Charts Company)	71

== Certifications ==
Region	Certification	Certified units/sales
Canada (Music Canada)	Gold	40,000^{‡}
New Zealand (RMNZ)	Gold	15,000^{‡}
United Kingdom (BPI)	Gold	400,000^{‡}
United States (RIAA)	Gold	500,000^{‡}
^{‡} Sales+streaming figures based on certification alone.
