= The Man (Ed Sheeran song) =

Promotional single by Ed Sheeran

from the album x
- Released: 19 June 2014
- Genre: Hip hop; soul
- Length: 4:09
- Label: Asylum; Atlantic
- Songwriter: Ed Sheeran
- Producer: Jake Gosling

"The Man" is a song by English singer-songwriter Ed Sheeran. It features production from frequent collaborator Jake Gosling. The song was released as an "instant grat" digital download to the iTunes Store on 19 June 2014, serving as the sixth of seven promotional singles from his second studio album, x (2014). It entered the UK Singles Chart at number 87.

At his concert in Düsseldorf on 5 November 2014, Sheeran played "The Man" as his pick for the night and said that he had only ever played it live once before, and that it is the one song he wished he had never put on an album, as writing it was therapeutic and thus very personal.

== Critical reception ==
Billboard's Jason Lipshutz has likened Sheeran's rapping to Mike Skinner of The Streets.

== Charts ==
Chart (2014)	Peak position
Denmark (Tracklisten)	9
France (SNEP)	49
Ireland (IRMA)	80
Netherlands (Single Top 100)	56
Spain (PROMUSICAE)	50
UK Singles (Official Charts Company)	87

== Certifications ==
Region	Certification	Certified units/sales
New Zealand (RMNZ)	Gold	15,000^{‡}
United Kingdom (BPI)	Silver	200,000^{‡}
^{‡} Sales+streaming figures based on certification alone.
