= One (Ed Sheeran song) =

Promotional single by Ed Sheeran

from the album x
- Released: 16 May 2014
- Recorded: Sticky Studios; (Windlesham, Surrey, England)
- Genre: Folk-pop
- Length: 4:13
- Label: Asylum; Atlantic
- Songwriter: Ed Sheeran
- Producer: Jake Gosling

"One" is a song recorded by English singer-songwriter Ed Sheeran for his second studio album, x (2014). Sheeran wrote the song immediately after releasing his debut album, + (2011). It marked the last occasion wherein Sheeran wrote about his former girlfriend, who inspired all the romantic compositions on +. "One" was produced by frequent collaborator Jake Gosling and its music was based primarily on acoustic guitar. Critics were generally positive toward the song; it was noted for its guitar-driven sound and Sheeran's use of falsetto.

An accompanying video for "One" was shot in an empty Wembley SSE Arena and preceded the song's release on 16 May 2014. It was the first promotional single from x. In Europe, the song appeared in several charts; it reached number 18 in the United Kingdom, where it was certified Gold for sales of at least 400,000 units on 7 April 2014.

== Background and release ==
Shortly after the release of his debut album, +, Sheeran wrote "One" in November 2011 while he was on tour in Perth, Australia. Inside his dressing room, he composed the song on a guitar made of a whiskey barrel. "One" was the first song Sheeran wrote for his second studio album, x. The song was produced by Jake Gosling, who contributed to the majority of tracks featured on Sheeran's debut album. Gosling owned Sticky Studios, located in the small Surrey village of Windlesham, where Sheeran recorded "One".

Sheeran wrote "One" as the last song about Alice, his former girlfriend who inspired all the romantic songs on +. It is the only song on x that refers to that particular relationship, while the rest was about "moving on and the [...] experiences [Sheeran] had since then". According to Sheeran, the song "is a good way to end both that period and that relationship". In "One", Sheeran finds himself bidding farewell to a former love interest. Sheeran takes a minimal approach on this ballad, which is characterised with softly strummed acoustic guitar.

"One" was released on 16 May 2014 as the first promotional single from x. It was made available as an "instant great" download for those who pre-ordered the album on iTunes Store. The promotional release of "One" was meant to counterbalance "Sing", the album's lead single. "Sing" was intended to create hype over the album release, but was feared would alienate Sheeran's fan base. Preceding the song's release, an official video premiered on Sheeran's YouTube channel on 2 May 2014. The black-and-white video was shot in an empty Wembley Arena in London, England. It features Sheeran performing live an acoustic version of the song. Sheeran performed "One" on his x Tour, which ran from 2014 to 2015.

== Reception ==
Upon the release of x, "One" received positive reviews. Neil McCormick of The Daily Telegraph described Sheeran's style in "One" alongside "Photograph" a "soulful balladry". Luiza Lodder of No Ripcord believed that the "strumming and melodies" are "heartfelt". On another note, The Guardian's Alexis Petridis suggested that the "striking and beautiful" ballads in the album "evince a certain new-found maturity". Petridis felt that "One" is a "haunting, falsetto-powered" ballad. Annie Zaleski of The A.V. Club noted Sheeran's "weak-kneed" falsetto in the "fragile acoustic pop". Sarah Rodman of The Boston Globe noted similarities between "One" and Sheeran's 2011 single "The A Team" for their tunefulness; she described the former as "burbling". Dave Hanratty of Drowned in Sound had the same opinion: "'One' [was] cut from the exact same cloth as 'The A Team'", although he favored "One" as better. Jim Beviglia of American Songwriter stated that the song "[did] a nice job mixing drunken regret with romantic dedication". In a cover interview with Sheeran for Billboard, Chris Willman opined that on "One", Sheeran took his "minimalist live approach to its furthest degree".

"One", and the rest of the tracks from x, entered the UK Singles Chart due to high streaming rates. It debuted at number 20 on the chart week ending 24 May 2014, it peaked at number 18 on the following week, and has appeared on the chart for 20 weeks. On 30 June 2015, the British Phonographic Industry certified the song silver, denoting sales of 200,000 units. The song appeared once on the main US chart; it debuted at number 87 on the Billboard Hot 100.

== Credits and personnel ==
Credits adapted from the liner notes of x

- Ed Sheeran – vocals, songwriting, guitar
- Jake Gosling – production, engineering, programming, drums, strings, horns
- Adam Coltman – assistant engineering
- Mark "Spike" Stent – mixing
- Geoff Swan – engineering
- Stuart Hawkes – mastering

== Charts and certifications ==
Chart (2014)	Peak position
Australia (ARIA)	72
Austria (Ö3 Austria Top 40)	45
Canada Hot 100 (Billboard)	32
France (SNEP)	121
Germany (GfK)	79
Ireland (IRMA)	54
Netherlands (Single Top 100)	97
Scotland Singles (OCC)	17
South Korea (Gaon)	26
UK Singles (OCC)	18
US Billboard Hot 100	87

Region	Certification	Certified units/sales
Canada (Music Canada)	Platinum	80,000^{‡}
Denmark (IFPI Danmark)	Gold	45,000^{‡}
Italy (FIMI)	Gold	25,000^{‡}
New Zealand (RMNZ)	Platinum	30,000^{‡}
United Kingdom (BPI)	Gold	400,000^{‡}
United States (RIAA)	Platinum	1,000,000^{‡}
^{‡} Sales+streaming figures based on certification alone.
