= Street football (association football) =

Informal football variant

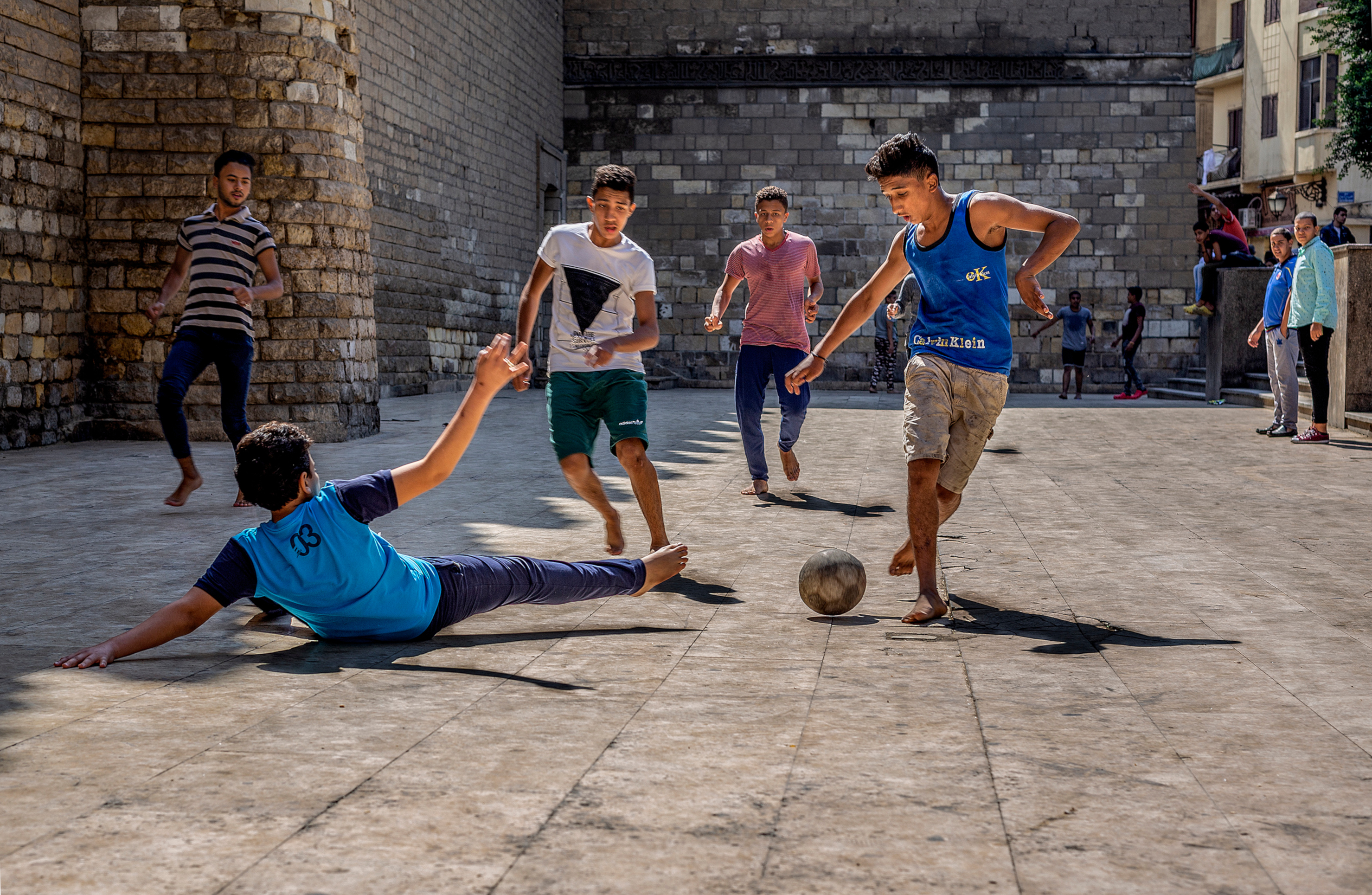
A group of boys playing football near Al-Hakim Mosque in Cairo, Egypt

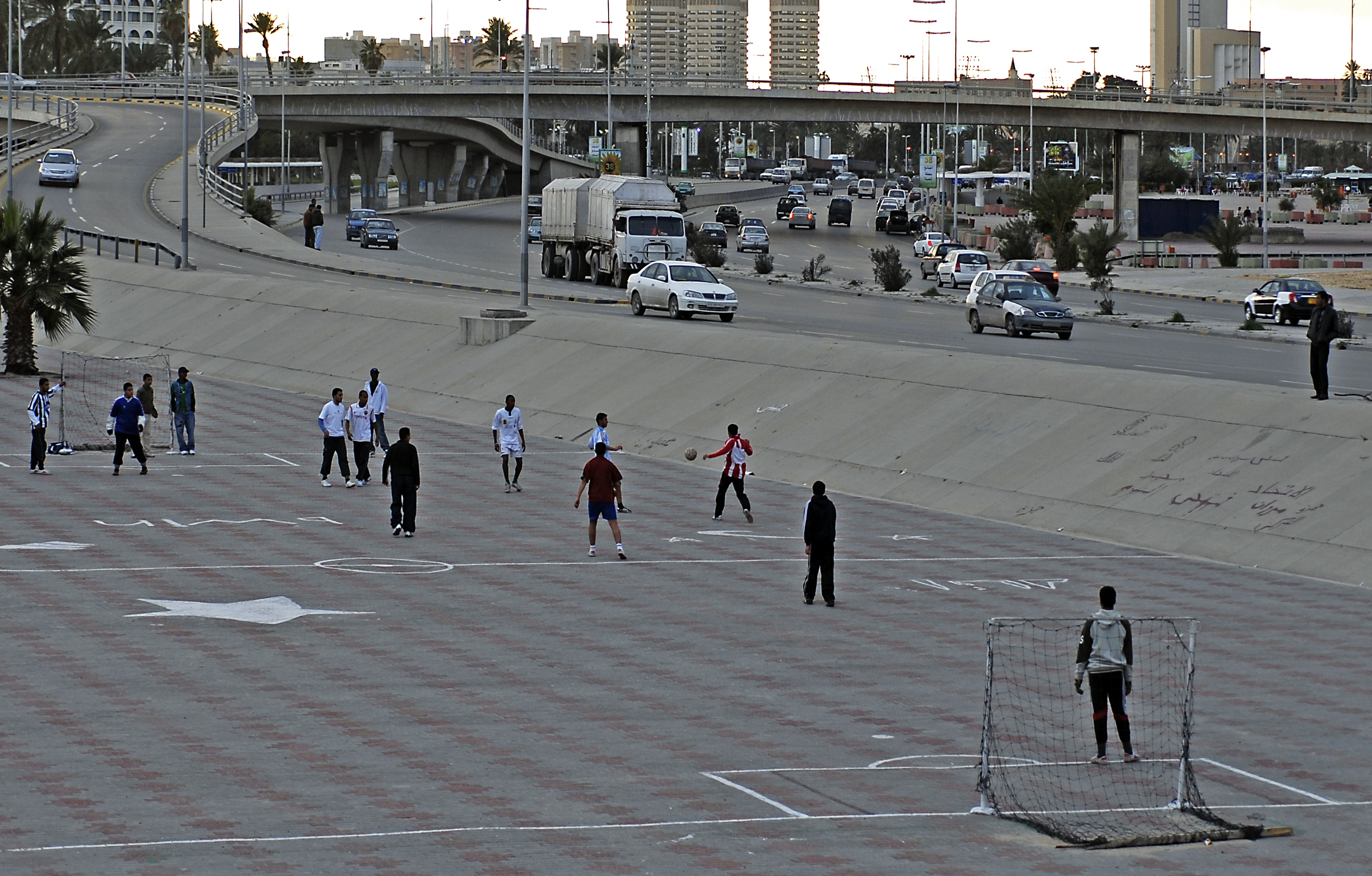
A group of men on a concrete football pitch in Tripoli, Libya

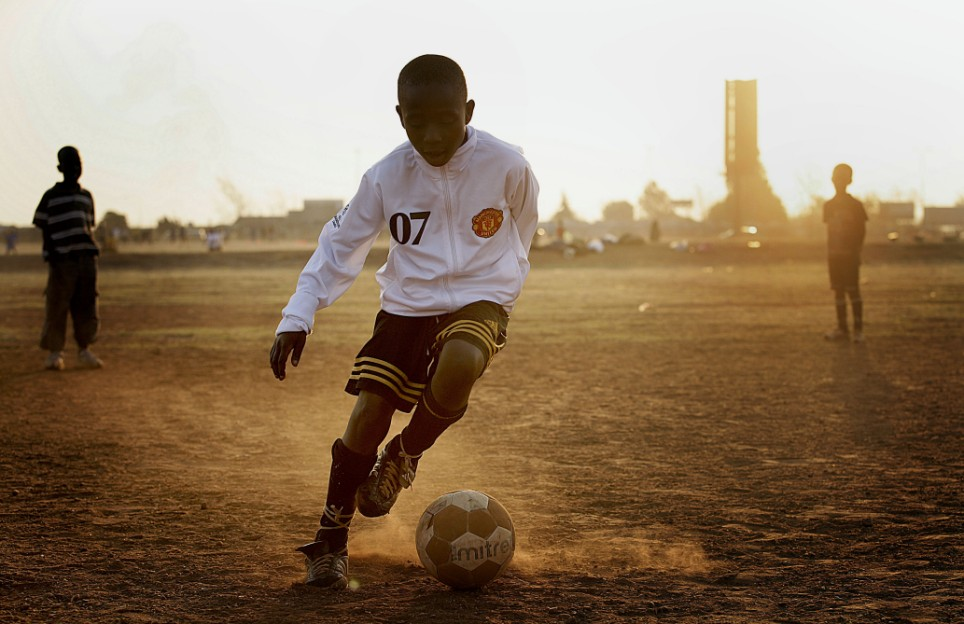
A boy dribbling on an urban football pitch in Soweto, South Africa

Street football or street soccer is an informal variation on the game of association football, typically played in outdoor urban settings such as streets, playgrounds and car parks. The term encompasses a variety of different formats, which do not necessarily follow the requirements of a formal game of football, such as a large field, field markings, goal apparatus and corner flags, eleven players per team, or match officials (referee and assistant referees). Often street football is played as a pick-up game, without fixed timing and with players joining and leaving at any point.

Several footballers stated that they learned to play football on the street, including the likes of Diego Maradona, Johan Cruyff, Pelé, Giuseppe Meazza, Éamon Dunphy, Eusebio, Dejan Savićević, Cristiano Ronaldo, and Michael Olise among others.

== Background ==
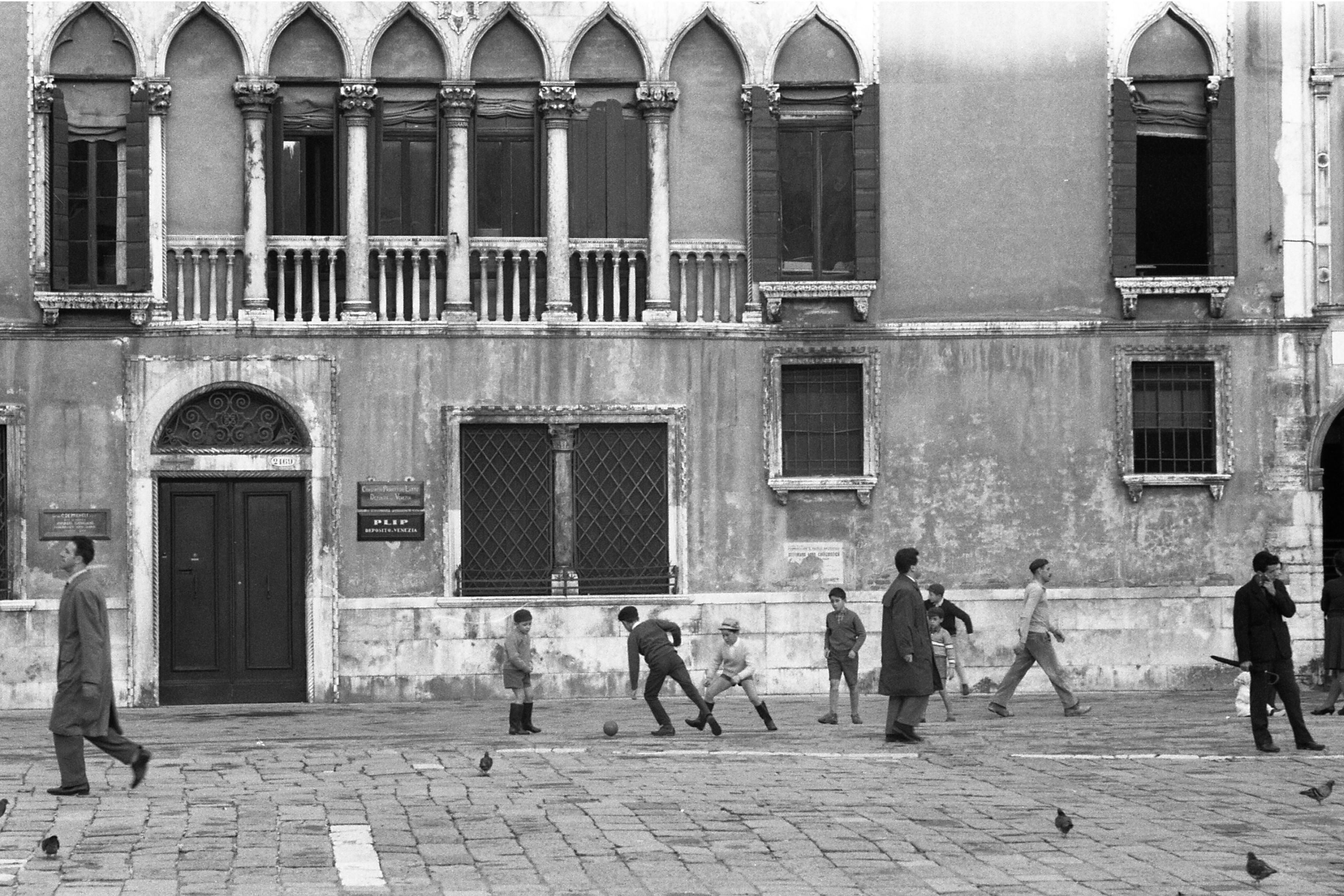
Street football, Venice (1960)

Street football is more similar to beach football and futsal than to association football. Often the most basic of set-ups will involve just a ball with a wall or fence used as a goal, or items such as clothing being used for goalposts (hence the phrase "jumpers for goalposts"). The phrase was used by Ed Sheeran in his 2015 documentary Jumpers for Goalposts: Live at Wembley Stadium as a nod to playing the concerts at Wembley Stadium, the "home of football."

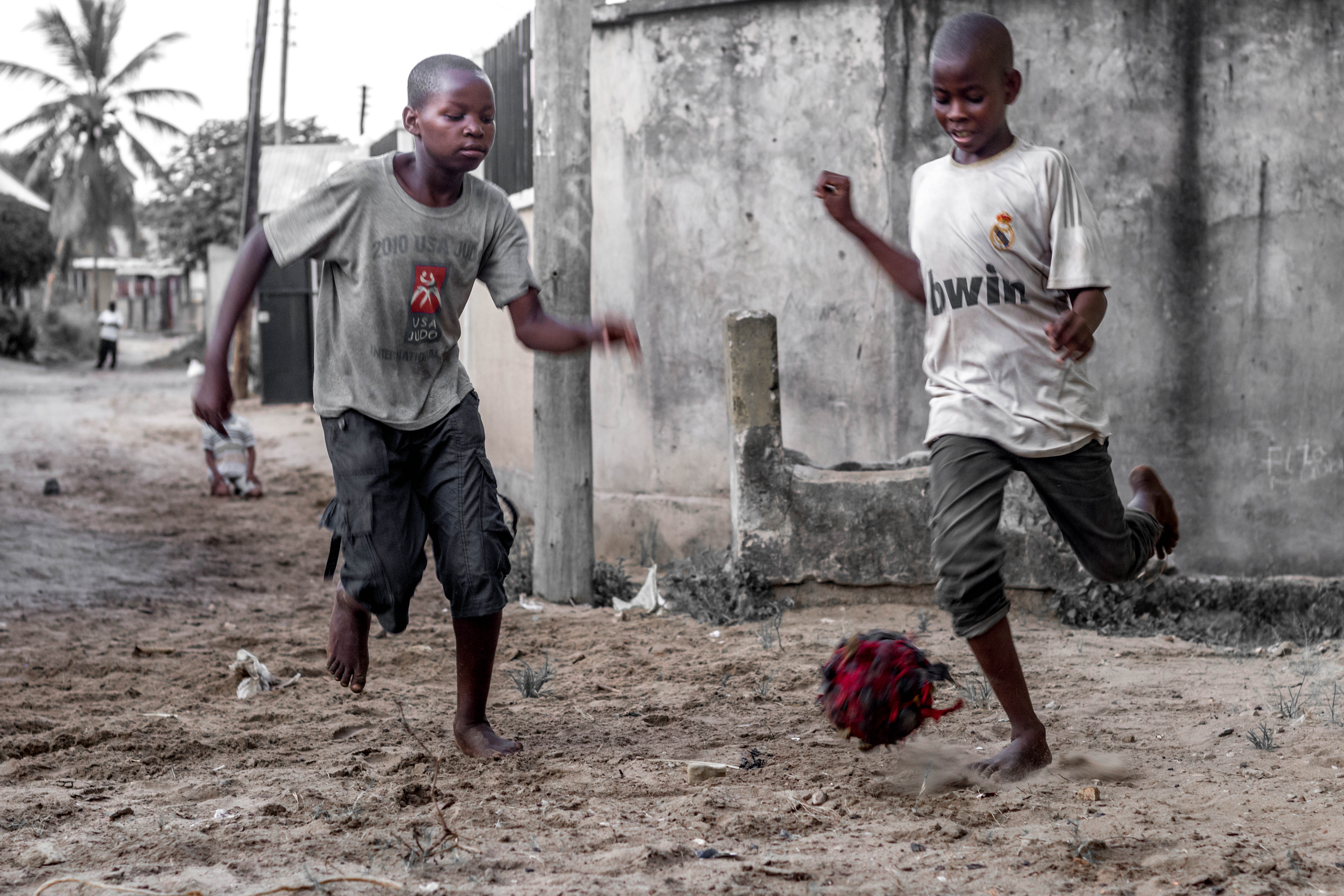
Children playing with an improvised ball in Tanzania

In some cases, a standard ball is not available and street football depends on a ball made out of garbage, such as discarded plastic. Handwalla Bwana, describing street football in the Kakuma refugee camp said "We used to make a garbage ball. We used to go through the garbage cans and make as much soccer ball as we could" and attributed use of the garbage ball to being better with his feet. Johan Cruyff has said "Footballers from the street are more important than trained coaches."

The ease of playing these informal games on the streets and open spaces make football the most popular sport in the world.

== Video games ==
In 2005, video game publisher Electronic Arts introduced FIFA Street, a franchise based on street football and freestyle football. FIFA Street series focuses on flair, style and trickery, reflecting the cultures of street football and freestyle football played in streets and backlots across the world.

In 2019, Electronic Arts added a Volta gameplay mode to FIFA 20. It shares similarities to the FIFA Street series and has a storyline of a street football player playing through the ranks, both making new friends and losing old ones along the way.

== See also ==
- Streetball
- Homeless World Cup
