= X (Ed Sheeran album) =

2014 Ed Sheeran album, pronounced 'multiply'

x

Studio album by Ed Sheeran
- Released: 20 June 2014
- Genres: Pop; folk-pop; hip-hop; R&B; soul
- Length: 50:24
- Labels: Asylum; Atlantic
- Producers: Benny Blanco; Ed Sheeran; Emile Haynie; Jake Gosling; Jeff Bhasker; Johnny McDaid; Pharrell Williams; Rick Rubin

Ed Sheeran chronology
The Slumdon Bridge (2012)	x (2014)	5 (2015)

Singles from x
- 1. "Sing" Released: 7 April 2014; 2. "Don't" Released: 14 August 2014; 3. "Thinking Out Loud" Released: 24 September 2014; 4. "Bloodstream" Released: 11 February 2015; 5. "Photograph" Released: 11 May 2015

x (Multiply) is the second studio album by English singer-songwriter, Ed Sheeran. It was released on 20 June 2014 in Australia and New Zealand, and worldwide on 23 June through Asylum Records and Atlantic Records. The album received positive reviews from music critics. It was an international commercial success, peaking at No. 1 in 15 countries, while topping both the UK Albums Chart and the US Billboard 200. x also reached the top five in seven other countries and was the best selling album of 2014 in Australia, New Zealand, Ireland, and the United Kingdom. Five singles were released from the album: "Sing", "Don't", "Thinking Out Loud", "Bloodstream" (a collaboration with Rudimental), and "Photograph".

The lead single, "Sing", became Sheeran's first UK number-one song, reached number 13 in the US and peaked inside the top 10 in several other countries. The second single, "Don't", peaked at No. 8 in the UK and number nine on the US Billboard Hot 100, becoming Sheeran's first top-10 single in the US. The album's third single, "Thinking Out Loud", achieved international success, peaking at number one in 12 countries, and the top five in 12 more. It became Sheeran's second UK number-one single and has been certified 7× Platinum, with sales of over 4.2 million copies in the UK. "Thinking Out Loud" also became Sheeran's biggest hit in the US at the time, peaking at number two on the Billboard Hot 100, until he released "Shape of You", which debuted at number one. The album's fourth single, a remix of "Bloodstream", peaked at number two on the UK Singles Chart, becoming the fourth-consecutive single from x to hit the top 10 in Sheeran's native country. "Photograph" was released as the album's fifth and final single. It gave Sheeran his fifth consecutive top 10 single from the album in Australia and New Zealand, peaking at numbers nine and eight, respectively.

In December 2014, Spotify named x the most-streamed album in the world for 2014, racking up more than 430 million streams for the year. x has been certified 13× Platinum in the UK with sales of over 3.9 million copies, making it the third best-selling album of the 2010s and the 20th best selling album in the history of the UK. The album has been certified Diamond in Canada, 16× Platinum in New Zealand, and 5× Platinum in the US, with sales of over five million copies. It also became the first album ever to be certified Diamond in Australia. Also, x broke Adele's record for the longest charting top 10 album in the history of the United Kingdom. In 2015, x won the Brit Award for British Album of the Year, and at the 57th Grammy Awards it was nominated for Best Pop Vocal Album and Album of the Year.

The 10th anniversary edition of the album with bonus tracks was released on 21 June 2024.

== Background and recording ==
Having written "hundreds" of songs, Sheeran entered the studio with Rubin and they cut that down to the 15 new songs that are feature on the album, excluding "I See Fire", which was recorded separately and saw release on the soundtrack for The Hobbit: The Desolation of Smaug. Sheeran stated that he "started off making another acoustic record, and it turned into a neo-soul-funk record," due to the influence of working with producers like Rubin and Benny Blanco that "pulled [him] out of [his] comfort zone." Getting into the studio with Rubin to "rerecord all the songs" after two years of writing them made the songs sound "raw and interesting", at a time when Sheeran was getting tired of them, giving him a chance to "actually set up the album instead of just putting it out." However, doing an entire album with Rubin "just wouldn't work on pop radio", so after working with Rubin he wrote the songs, "I'm a Mess", and "Thinking Out Loud", both about his girlfriend at the time, with a different producer. Jake Gosling, who co-wrote and produced the majority of Sheeran's debut album, has no writing credits on this album, while new collaborators include Snow Patrol's Gary Lightbody and British drum and bass band, Rudimental.

== Music and lyrics ==
"One" was the first song Sheeran wrote for the album, and is "particularly quiet". Written on a guitar made out of wood from a whisky barrel in a hotel room whilst on tour in Perth in 2011, the song was the last song written about the love interest that was the focus of the previous album. "I'm a Mess" was one of the last songs written, after the recording sessions with Rubin. It is one of two songs written about his then-current girlfriend. It is described as a simple song, and was "written in the shower."

In an interview with Zane Lowe for BBC Radio 1, promoting the first single, "Sing", Sheeran talked about getting in the studio with Pharrell and him "playing [Sheeran] a lot of things, and then it stuck on this one riff," which eventually became the basis of the track. He stated he has always been a fan of R&B, but was just "trying to find the right way to make it." Sheeran expressed wishes to create an entire album with Pharrell, and "Sing" was to be a song for that project, but several musical peers, including Elton John, Taylor Swift and Pharrell himself, urged Sheeran to release it with x. Justin Timberlake's debut album, Justified, was a favourite of Sheeran's, which he consciously tried to channel for "Sing". On working with Pharrell, Sheeran told MistaJam on BBC Radio 1Xtra that they had written two other songs together that were in the style he "usually did", but for "Sing" he was pushed "out of [his] comfort zone" which made the track stand out. Pharrell reportedly said that he wanted to "shake the world's view of [Sheeran] up" and make pioneering songs that no singer/songwriter has done before rather than just "a cool record". A remix of the track has been made with Korean recording artist Psy, and the music video for the song was based on a night out with the artist.

"Don't", which is about a girlfriend who cheated on Sheeran with a close friend, has been linked to several of Sheeran's fellow singers, including Ellie Goulding and Taylor Swift, but Sheeran has said it is "100 percent not about Taylor", but that he has played her the song, and she "never want[s] to piss [him] off that much." It started off "as a riff on his phone". "Don't" was planned to be released as the first single from the album, but it was decided that the chorus, especially the line "Don't f- with my love," was not suitable for a first single. The song was recorded first with Benny Blanco, then again with Rick Rubin, and the two producers came together to produce the final cut. The song almost didn't make it onto the album, as Sheeran felt it was "a bit personal", but was urged by those who had heard the demo to release it, as it was "an alright song... so it ended up on the record."

"Nina" was written with Johnny McDaid, and was the first song the pair wrote for the album. According to McDaid, it is a "self-deprecating" love song about "heartbreak... where he basically calls someone up and advises her not to be with him." "Photograph", also written with McDaid whilst touring with his band Snow Patrol in May 2012, is a "timeless ballad". Sheeran plays "photograph" with careful piano keys and acoustic strums and carefully adds in arenasize drums. It started life as a "piano loop playing on [McDaid's] laptop" which Sheeran started singing along to. Sheeran has stated "it will be the one that will change my career path", and believes it to be the one song that will sell the album, even "if the rest of the album is shit." Described as "[Sheeran's] Angels", the song is a "ballad with big drums, set in New York."

"Bloodstream" is about Sheeran's experience of taking MDMA during a friend's wedding party in Ibiza. "Tenerife Sea", first played in demo form at Sheeran's sold out Madison Square Garden shows, is "trademark acoustic balladry". Sheeran wrote the song about his mother. Ed told the media that his mothers eyes were crystal blue - "the most beautiful eyes I had ever seen" - and that's what this song was based on.

"Runaway" is the second and final track from the album that is produced by Pharrell Williams. Described as "finger-clicking", it draws from the same influence, the sound of Justin Timberlake's debut album, that "Sing" does. Sheeran intended for the song to feature on a future project with Pharrell, but it was put on the album when he was persuaded to include "Sing". "The Man", produced by long-time collaborator Jake Gosling, features Sheeran rapping in a style similar to that of Mike Skinner from The Streets. The song focuses on a failed relationship, whilst touching on the subjects of marriage, chemical dependency and his career in the music industry.

"Thinking Out Loud" was the last song written for the album, and it is also Sheeran's favourite. Written about Sheeran's then-current girlfriend after the recording sessions with Rick Rubin were over, it is a "soul" song, and Sheeran "pinned [it] as the 'walking down the aisle' song." He described it as "the only happy song on the album", and he wrote it in his kitchen.

"Afire Love" was written about Sheeran's grandfather "two weeks before he passed away". He had suffered with Alzheimer's disease for twenty years, and Sheeran has been thinking "What if [he passed away]? And then he did." Sheeran finished writing the song at his funeral. It explains the aftermath of his death, with his family reuniting for the funeral, and explains the deep love between his grandparents. "Take It Back" is the first track exclusive to the deluxe edition of the album. In it, Sheeran claims not to be a rapper, whilst delivering four rapped verses. In the same vein as previous single "You Need Me, I Don't Need You", he talks about "his personal struggles and his rise to fame." "I See Fire", the final track on the electronic deluxe edition (the physical deluxe version has a seventeenth track, "All of the Stars", the song used in the credits for the film The Fault in Our Stars), was previously released on the soundtrack for the second installment of The Hobbit film series. Sheeran was asked to write the song for the closing credits by the film's director, Peter Jackson, whose daughter was a fan of his work. After flying to New Zealand to watch the film, he wrote the majority of the song in a single day, performing all the instruments, apart from the cello, including a violin, which Sheeran taught himself to play for the song. The track was produced by Sheeran himself, and mixed in Abbey Road Studios by Peter Cobbin and Kirsty Whalley. It was released on 5 November 2013 as the first single from the soundtrack.

The album was to originally include profanity, most notably in the songs "Sing", "Don't" and "The Man", however a taxi driver convinced Sheeran to censor the album due to his young daughter being a fan. As a result, the album does not bear the Parental Advisory: Explicit Content sticker.

== Artwork and packaging ==
The cover of the x studio album, pronounced "multiply", shows a large black lowercase letter x in a green background instead of the multiplication sign ×. The multiplication sign has the shape of a (rotationally symmetric) saltire, whereas the glyph of the letter x lacks the four-fold rotational symmetry of the saltire.

In a live webcast on YouTube, Sheeran stated that he "feel[s] every single one of [his] records should have a theme that runs through it, even if it's just a colour. The first one was orange, throughout, everything [he] did was orange. This one's going to be green throughout, and everything [he does] will be green in terms of artwork." He cited Coldplay as an influence for this, as they keep with the image of each album they release "for the next two years".

The physical versions of the album come packaged in a green jewel case.

== Promotion ==
The countdown to the unveiling of the first single was posted on Sheeran's Facebook page, but it was accidentally announced early by Zane Lowe that he would have the first play of "Sing" on 7 April 2014, as his "Hottest Record in the World". The song was played twice in a row, and Sheeran discussed the album and working with Pharrell to produce the single. Sheeran performed "Sing" and "Don't" live for the first time on Saturday Night Live on 12 April 2014. He then went on to do an exclusive acoustic performance of "Take It Back" on SB.TV on 16 April. Sheeran later performed "Sing" on 27 April at the 2014 Logie Awards held annually in Melbourne, Australia. On 2 May, the singer released an acoustic version of "One" on his YouTube channel. The song was given away on 16 May to people who had preordered the album on iTunes. On 5 May, Sheeran played three "Multiplyed" gigs, starting at the Steamboat Pub in Ipswich, going on to Koko in London, and finishing in Dublin, where his entire show was streamed live on his website. The next day, he played a session for BBC Radio 1 at their Maida Vale studios, where Zane Lowe made a live rendition of "One" his "Hottest Record in the World". Sheeran stated that until the album was released, he would play very few new songs live, as fans "want to hear the hits", but once it is released he will play a lot more new songs, as "that's going to be what people want to see."

Sheeran played "Sing" on Later Live... with Jools Holland on 20 May, and showcased songs from the record on the extended version on 23 May, including the TV debut of "Thinking Out Loud". His live performance was exactly three years since his last appearance on the show. Sheeran performed "Sing" on the finale of The Voice, alongside a duet with contestant Christina Grimmie of his song "All of the Stars", which features on the soundtrack for The Fault in Our Stars. MTV announced that a behind-the-scenes documentary of Sheeran's life, titled 9 Days and Nights of Ed Sheeran, was being filmed, to be aired 10 June. The show would "show every aspect of [Sheeran's] life" while he is on tour, "with extraordinary intimate access to Sheeran", something he has never done before. Taylor Swift and Pharrell Williams appeared in the feature. After the music video for "Sing" was released, which featured a puppet version of Sheeran wearing a pair of Beats by Dre headphones, it was announced that Sheeran, and his then unreleased song "Don't", would feature in the advert for the latest Beats by Dre headphones, the Solo II. On 5 June, Sheeran appeared in the BBC Radio 1 Live Lounge for Annie Mac, performing "Sing" and a cover of Sam Smith's "Stay with Me", both with a live band. "Don't" was serviced to US contemporary hit radio on 15 July 2014 as the album's second official single.

=== X Tour ===
To promote the album, Sheeran embarked on the x Tour (pronounced the "Multiply Tour"). He held several shows in Asia, Europe, North America, South America, Australia and New Zealand until December 2015.

The special "Wembley Edition" was released on 13 November 2015. This edition includes bonus tracks and a DVD of the Jumpers for Goalposts concert film.

== Singles ==
"Sing" was released as the first single from the album on 7 April 2014 around the world, and 1 June in United Kingdom and Germany. The music video, released exclusively to Facebook on 22 May, features a puppet caricature of Sheeran on a night out in Los Angeles. The single entered the Billboard Hot 100 at No. 15, where it has since peaked at No. 13. It also became Sheeran's first number-one on the Australian ARIA Charts and in the UK, where it was released alongside a corresponding EP, which featured a live version of the track, a remix by Trippy Turtle and a new song, "Friends", that is not featured on x.

"Don't", previously released on iTunes as the second "instant grat" promotional single, impacted US contemporary hit radio as the second official single from the album. It has since sold in excess of 3 million copies worldwide, including 1,464,000 copies in the US alone. It has peaked within the top-ten of nine international charts, including Australia, the UK and the aforementioned US. It then hit No. 9 on the Billboard Hot 100.

"Thinking Out Loud", was sent to Oceanian radio on 21 September as the third single. The official music video was released on 7 October. The song was incredibly successful, selling in excess of 5 million copies worldwide as of April 2015. The song peaked at No. 1 on both the UK Singles Chart and the Australian ARIA Charts. Moreover, it peaked at No. 2 on both the US Billboard Hot 100 and the Canadian Hot 100. "Thinking Out Loud" also peaked within the top-ten in 27 more countries including New Zealand, Germany and India. The song became Sheeran's second million-selling single in the UK, following 2011's "The A Team" Moreover, the song has sold almost 5 million copies in the US, being certified 5× Platinum. In September 2015, it became just the fifth single released in the 21st century to go 3× Platinum.

A remixed version of "Bloodstream" was released as the album's fourth single on 11 February 2015. The new version of the song was remixed by British drum and bass band, Rudimental and was released as a joint single. The song became Sheeran's fourth consecutive top-ten hit from the album by peaking at No. 2 on the UK Singles Chart.

"Photograph" was released as the fifth and final single from the album. On 22 April 2015, Sheeran tweeted "My next single from multiply is Photograph. Wait til you see the video, it's a special one. Very excited". Photograph then hit No.2 on Twitter Top Track Charts and also in Billboard Hot 100. The song first charted for a week in December 2014. Even before the announcement of an official release, "Photograph" was certified Silver in the UK for selling in excess of 200,000 copies. The music video for the single was released on 10 May 2015.

=== Promotional singles ===
"One" was entered in the UK Singles Chart at No. 20 and entered the Billboard Hot 100 at No. 86.

"Don't" was released as the second "instant grat" promotional single from the album on 13 June, ten days before the release of the album. It debuted at No. 21 in the Canadian Hot 100 on the chart dated 28 June 2014, the top debut for that week.

Sheeran revealed that he would be releasing a track from the album every weekday in the week leading up to the release, as promotional "instant grat" singles available to those who had preordered the deluxe edition of the album on iTunes. The first of these was "Afire Love", released on 16 June, followed by "Bloodstream" on 17 June, "Thinking Out Loud" on 18 June, "The Man" on 19 June and "Photograph" on 20 June.

== Critical reception ==
Professional ratings
Aggregate scores
Source	Rating
AnyDecentMusic?	6.0/10
Metacritic	67/100
Review scores
Source	Rating
The A.V. Club	B
AllMusic	3.5/5 stars
The Daily Telegraph	5/5 stars
Drowned in Sound	4/10
The Guardian	4/5 stars
The Independent	Negative
The Observer	2/5 stars
Rolling Stone	3/5 stars
Time Out	3/5 stars
USA Today	3.5/4 stars

Upon its release, x received positive reviews from music critics. The review aggregator website Metacritic assigns a "Metascore" to each album, which is based on the ratings and reviews of selected mainstream independent publications, and the release has a score of a 67 out of 100 based on 20 selected critics, indicating "generally favorable reviews". At The Daily Telegraph, Neil McCormick rated the album a perfect five stars, commenting how the album is like a "vehicle for emotional veracity, personal revelation and universal inclusion". Stephen Thomas Erlewine of AllMusic rated the album three-and-a-half stars out of five, remarking how Sheeran's usage of hip hop elements "keeps [the music] from being merely a bit of excellently crafted mature pop and gives it some appealing character." Jon O'Brien of AllMusic said that the album "encompassed [Sheeran's] acoustic/hip-hop hybrid sound, but also had an R&B feel in places along with straight-ahead pop." At The A.V. Club, Annie Zaleski graded the album a B, indicating how Sheeran is showing in his music that "growing up is messy and tough [...] but affirms that navigating life with maturity and confidence is possible." Randall Roberts of Los Angeles Times rated the album two-and-a-half stars out of four, calling the music "well-crafted, generous and willing to lay it on thick when necessary, but fun to be around nonetheless". At Entertainment Weekly, Melissa Maerz graded the album a B, commenting how even though Sheeran is "finally getting angry, taking aim at a pop-star girlfriend who slept with another guy" that "he's still a good boy after all." Alex Petridis of The Guardian rated the album four stars out of five, highlighting how the artist is "confidently pushing at the boundaries of what he does."

Jason Lipshutz of Billboard rated the album an 81 out of 100, and according to him, he "finds a hungry artist doing everything possible to elevate to another level, simply by abiding by his instincts". At Q, John Aizlewood rated the album four stars out of five, describing how Sheeran's usage of many collaborators could have been "a potentially foolish move, but Sheeran pulls it off, chiefly because... his friends bend to him, not the other way round." In addition, Aizlewood remarks how Sheeran has "used his success rather than been used by it", Brian Mansfield of USA Today rated the album three-and-a-half stars out of four, calling it a "rare album that satisfies expectations while simultaneously raising them", and saying it "showcases the sweet, achingly vulnerable songs" that is a hallmark of Sheeran's work. Sarah Rodman of The Boston Globe gave a positive review of the album, finding how Sheeran "comes into his own" with the release.

At Rolling Stone, Jon Dolan rated the album three stars out of five, suggesting that "A better album title might have been XXX" and cautioning that the album has "plenty of oversweet ballad moments". Jim Farber of New York Daily News rated the album three stars out of five, writing how "Sheeran can write a hummable tune and, clearly, has something young girls love even more than looks: heart." but had several criticisms including noting how his music was "milky bland", his lyrics "rote and soppy" and the album's sound as a whole was "unconvincing". Writing for musicOMH John Murphy rated the album three stars out of five, noting how "X will undoubtedly be another huge success for Sheeran, and if he can build on its good points, there could be an even better record lurking inside him as well", taking issue with the album's "huge reliance on epic sounding but bland ballad-anthems" which sound "calculated and a little bit cynical". Kitty Empire of The Observer was unimpressed by the album, rating it two stars out of five, and stated Sheeran's writing "[doesn't] actually find a new gear for the love song, just new turns of phrase, at a push". and "has a broad palette but lacks depth". Empire posited that Sheeran "can't cut it as a leading man", ultimately concluding that "Sing is quite easily the best song on x, probably because it sounds nothing like Sheeran". At Drowned in Sound, Dave Hanratty rated the album a four out of ten; criticising the release because it "offers a few lively embers, but never quite ignites", saying that Sheeran lacks any kind of noteworthy identity and that the majority of the album "is alternatively as generic and simpering as it gets". The Independent was highly critical of the album; noting the lyrics as a "stolid plod through clichés" having a "serotonin-reducing effect"; and Sheeran and the album as "bleary", "so bland", "without wit or sex appeal" and "authentically uninspiring".

ABC News' Allan Raible found Sheeran spent much of the album "trying to force the groove in the name of pop success", concluding that it was "a mixed bag leaning on the negative side of the equation". Time Out noted his music was "cloying", ultimately rating the album three stars out of five, saying "There's enough awkward rapping and gooey-eyed sentiment here to put cynical listeners off." and any progression from his previous album was only "slight". PopMatters rated the album six out of ten, acknowledging Sheeran as a "talented wordsmith [who] uses past experiences and stories and moulds them into money making songs that stick in your head for days" but noted some of his songs "lack originality and flare" and criticising Sheeran as "predictable and boring to see another singer songwriter talk about relationships and emotions". In an essay for Pitchfork, Michael Tedder noted that Sheeran's "Nice Guy Brand promises the consumer that the lovelorn troubadour is sensitive, nerdy [...], and won't break your heart like those other boys. But one listen to X reveals that he's not as far away from the macho types that unapologetically trash hotel rooms as he'd like you to think". He also explained that Sheeran is yet to appear in a Pitchfork Year End List due his inability to write music that "reroute[s] your brain and make you like it even when you don't want to like it", ultimately concluding that Sheeran's songwriting is "an unholy alliance between Simply Red and G. Love and Special Sauce (but, like, really white)".

=== Accolades ===
Accolades for x
Publication	Rank	List
Billboard	5	The 10 Best Albums of 2014
Digital Spy	5	Top Albums of 2014
The Daily Telegraph	1	Best 50 Albums of 2014

== Commercial performance ==
x debuted at number one on the UK Albums Chart, marking Sheeran's second number one album in the United Kingdom. It sold 180,000 copies in its first week of release to become the fastest-selling album of 2014, overtaking Coldplay's Ghost Stories. It stayed at number one for 12 non-consecutive weeks in the UK, the longest number one since Adele's 21 in 2011. x was the best-selling album of 2014 in the UK, selling over 1,689,000 copies and going five-time platinum. As of December 2015, the album has sold 2,660,000 copies in the UK. The album spent 74 consecutive weeks in the top ten, surpassing 21's 71-week record.

In the United States, the album debuted at number one on the Billboard 200 with first-week sales of 210,000 copies, becoming Sheeran's first number-one record in the country. Furthermore, Sheeran marked the second largest debut for a pop album in 2014 and the fourth-biggest opening overall of the year. In December 2015, the album was certified double platinum for shipments of two million albums by the Recording Industry Association of America. It reached 2 million copies sold there in February 2016. By July 2017, tracks from the album had accumulated over 1.51 billion on-demand audio streams in the US. In Canada, the album debuted at number one on the Canadian Albums Chart; in its second week, the album remained at number one selling 7,000 copies. It became the year's fourth best-selling album in Canada, having sold 133,000 copies over the course of the year.

In Australia, x spent eight non-consecutive weeks at number one and sold 490,000 copies. Until October 2015, the album had not left the top ten of the chart since its release. In November 2015, x became the first album to be certified Diamond by the Australian Recording Industry Association, a newly created category that denotes over 500,000 sales. x spent more than three years (156 weeks) in the top 10 of Ireland, where it spent 24 weeks at No. 1 with the last one being in its 137th charting week, and more than two years (104 weeks) in the top 10 of Denmark, New Zealand and Australia. The album reached the top 10 in 5 consecutive years, 2014 to 2018, in Australia, Denmark, Ireland (where it reached No. 1 in each of the years from 2014 to 2017), and the UK, and in 4 consecutive years, 2014 to 2017, in the Netherlands, New Zealand, Norway and Sweden.

According to the International Federation of the Phonographic Industry, x sold 4.4 million copies in 2014 and 3.5 million copies in 2015, becoming the third and second best-selling album, respectively.

== Track listing ==
Standard edition
No.	Title	Writer(s)	Producer(s)	Length
1.	"One"	Ed Sheeran	Jake Gosling	4:12
2.	"I'm a Mess"	Sheeran	Gosling	4:04
3.	"Sing"	Sheeran; Pharrell Williams	Williams	3:55
4.	"Don't"	Sheeran; Benjamin Levin	Rick Rubin; Benny Blanco	3:39
5.	"Nina"	Sheeran; Johnny McDaid	Gosling	3:45
6.	"Photograph"	Sheeran; McDaid; Martin Harrington; Thomas Leonard	Jeff Bhasker; Emile Haynie^{[a]}	4:18
7.	"Bloodstream"	Sheeran; McDaid; Gary Lightbody; Rudimental	Rubin; Rudimental	5:00
8.	"Tenerife Sea"	Sheeran; McDaid; Foy Vance	Rubin	4:01
9.	"Runaway"	Sheeran; Williams	Williams	3:25
10.	"The Man"	Sheeran	Gosling	4:10
11.	"Thinking Out Loud"	Sheeran; Amy Wadge	Gosling	4:41
12.	"Afire Love"	Sheeran; McDaid; Vance	McDaid	5:14
Total length:				50:24

Deluxe edition
No.	Title	Writer(s)	Producer(s)	Length
13.	"Take It Back"	Sheeran; McDaid	Rubin	3:28
14.	"Shirtsleeves"	Sheeran	Gosling	3:10
15.	"Even My Dad Does Sometimes"	Sheeran; Wadge	Gosling	3:48
16.	"I See Fire"	Sheeran	Sheeran	4:59
17.	"All of the Stars"	Sheeran; McDaid	McDaid	3:57
Total length:				69:42

10th anniversary edition
No.	Title	Writer(s)	Producer(s)	Length
18.	"English Rose"	Sheeran; McDaid	McDaid	3:04
19.	"Touch and Go"	Sheeran	Rubin	4:00
20.	"New York"	Sheeran	Haynie	3:55
21.	"Make It Rain"	Vance		6:44

Notes

- ^{^[a]} signifies an additional producer
- The French collector edition includes "Everything You Are", "Friends", "Sing" (live), "I'm a Mess" (live), and "Don't" (remix featuring Rick Ross).
- The Wembley edition includes a DVD Jumpers for Goalposts, and bonus tracks: "English Rose", "Touch and Go", "New York", "Make It Rain", "Lay It All on Me" (with Rudimental), and "Reuf" (with Nekfeu) (in France).
- "Don't" incorporates elements of "Don't Mess with My Man", written by Raphael Saadiq, Dawn Robinson, Ali Shaheed Muhammad, and Conesha Owens, and performed by Lucy Pearl.
- "Nina" contains a sample from "Welcome to My World" by Wretch 32, written by Jermaine Scott, Isra Andja-Diumi Lohata, and Jay Lee Robert Hippolyte.
- "Afire Love" contains elements from "Remembering Jenny" composed by Christophe Beck, taken from Buffy the Vampire Slayer: The Score.

== Personnel ==
All credits taken from album liner notes.

Main personnel

- Ed Sheeran – lead vocals, acoustic guitar, electric guitar, handclaps ("I'm a Mess" and "Nina"), instrumentation and programming ("Don't"), violin ("I See Fire"), production ("I See Fire")
- Jake Gosling – production, engineering, programming, keyboards and drums ("One", "I'm a Mess", "Nina", "The Man", "Thinking Out Loud", "Shirtsleeves" and "Even My Dad Does Sometimes"), percussion ("I'm a Mess", "Nina", "Thinking Out Loud" and "Shirtsleeves"), piano and handclaps ("I'm a Mess" and "Nina"), synths ("Nina"), Rhodes ("The Man"), strings and horns ("One"), bass guitar ("Even My Dad Does Sometimes")
- Pharrell Williams – production and background vocals ("Sing"), production ("Runaway")
- Benny Blanco – production, instrumentation and programming ("Don't")
- Rick Rubin – production ("Don't", "Bloodstream", "Tenerife Sea" and "Take It Back"), instrumentation and programming ("Don't")
- Johnny McDaid – production and engineering ("Afire Love" and "All of the Stars"), programming ("Afire Love"), keys ("Tenerife Sea" and "Bloodstream"), guitars, bass, backing vocals, percussion, piano, Hammond ("Afire Love")
- Jeff Bhasker – production, piano, keys and bass guitar ("Photograph")
- Foy Vance – backing vocals ("Afire Love")
- Amy Wadge – piano ("Even My Dad Does Sometimes")
- Geoff Swan – engineering (all standard edition tracks)
- Mark "Spike" Stent – mixing (all standard album tracks)
- Ruadhri Cushnan – mixing (all deluxe edition tracks, excluding "I See Fire")
- Grant Rawlinson – assistant mixing ("Take It Back", "Shirtsleeves" and "Even My Dad Does Sometimes")
- Pete Cobbin – mixing ("I See Fire")
- Kirsty Whalley – mixing ("I See Fire")
- Stuart Hawkes – mastering

Additional personnel

- Coco Arquette – additional vocals and gang percussion ("Afire Love")
- Johnnie Burik – assistant production ("Don't", "Bloodstream" and "Tenerife Sea")
- Eric Cardieux – digital editing ("Don't", "Bloodstream" and "Tenerife Sea")
- Lenny Castro – percussion ("Don't", "Bloodstream" and "Tenerife Sea")
- Andrew Coleman – recording, digital editing, arrangement and additional guitars ("Sing" and "Runaway")
- Nigel Collins – cello ("I See Fire")
- Adam Coltman – assistant engineer ("One")
- Luis Conte – percussion ("Don't", "Bloodstream" and "Tenerife Sea")
- Courteney Cox – additional vocals and gang percussion ("Afire Love")
- Chris Dave – drums ("Bloodstream" and "Tenerife Sea")
- Steve Gallagher – recording ("I See Fire")
- Matthew Gooderham – assistant engineer ("Nina")
- Peter Gosling – piano ("Thinking Out Loud")
- Matty Green – engineering ("Don't")
- Dave Hanych – production coordination ("Don't", "Bloodstream" and "Tenerife Sea")
- Eamon Harkin – additional vocals and gang percussion ("Afire Love")
- Emile Haynie – additional production and drum programming ("Photograph")
- William Hicks – additional vocal editing ("I'm a Mess", "Don't" and "The Man"), engineering ("Don't")
- Ed Howard – handclaps ("Nina")
- Seif "Mageef" Hussain – production coordination ("Don't")
- Tyler Sam Johnson – engineering, electric guitar and drum programming ("Photograph")
- Graham Kennedy – recording ("I See Fire")
- Ricardo Kim – assistant production ("Don't", "Bloodstream" and "Tenerife Sea")
- Jason Lader – engineering, keyboards and bass guitar ("Don't"), recording and keyboards ("Bloodstream" and "Tenerife Sea"), bass guitar on ("Tenerife Sea")
- Christian "Leggy" Langdon – digital editing ("Don't", "Bloodstream" and "Tenerife Sea")
- Geoff Leaa – drums ("Afire Love")
- Chris Leonard – guitars and bass guitar ("I'm a Mess", "Nina" and "Thinking Out Loud"), guitars ("The Man" and "Even My Dad Does Sometimes"), handclaps ("I'm a Mess" and "Nina")
- Andrew "McMuffin" Luftman – production coordination ("Don't")
- Eric Lynn – additional recording ("Don't", "Bloodstream" and "Tenerife Sea"), keyboards ("Bloodstream" and "Tenerife Sea")
- Adam MacDougall – keyboards ("Don't" and "Bloodstream")
- Blake Mills – guitar ("Tenerife Sea")
- Sean Oakley – additional recording and digital editing ("Don't", "Bloodstream" and "Tenerife Sea")
- Ramon Rivas – recording assistant ("Sing" and "Runaway")
- Davide Rossi – string arrangement ("Photograph"), live strings ("Afire Love")
- Chris "Anger Management" Sclafani – engineering ("Don't")
- Joshua Smith – additional recording ("Don't", "Bloodstream" and "Tenerife Sea")
- Rob Sucheki – recording assistant ("Sing" and "Runaway")

== Charts ==
=== Weekly charts ===
Weekly chart performance for x
Chart (2014–2019)	Peak position
Australian Albums (ARIA)	1
Austrian Albums (Ö3 Austria)	2
Belgian Albums (Ultratop Flanders)	2
Belgian Albums (Ultratop Wallonia)	8
Brazilian Albums (ABPD)	9
Canadian Albums (Billboard)	1
Croatian International Albums (HDU)	14
Czech Albums (ČNS IFPI)	10
Danish Albums (Hitlisten)	1
Dutch Albums (Album Top 100)	1
Finnish Albums (Suomen virallinen lista)	1
French Albums (SNEP)	5
German Albums (Offizielle Top 100)	1
Hungarian Albums (MAHASZ)	3
Irish Albums (IRMA)	1
Italian Albums (FIMI)	2
Japanese Albums (Oricon)	32
Latvian Albums (LaIPA)	34
Mexican Albums (AMPROFON)	17
New Zealand Albums (RMNZ)	1
Norwegian Albums (VG-lista)	1
Polish Albums (ZPAV)	1
Portuguese Albums (AFP)	2
Scottish Albums (Official Charts)	1
South African Albums (RISA)	1
South Korean Albums (Gaon)	45
Spanish Albums (Promusicae)	6
Swedish Albums (Sverigetopplistan)	1
Swiss Albums (Schweizer Hitparade)	1
UK Albums (Official Charts)	1
US Billboard 200	1

=== Year-end charts ===
2014 year-end chart performance for x
Chart (2014)	Position
Australian Albums (ARIA)	1
Austrian Albums (Ö3 Austria)	35
Belgian Albums (Ultratop Flanders)	11
Belgian Albums (Ultratop Wallonia)	63
Canadian Albums (Billboard)	10
Danish Albums (Hitlisten)	25
Dutch Albums (MegaCharts)	9
Finnish Albums (Suomen virallinen lista)	4
French Albums (SNEP)	86
German Albums (Offizielle Top 100)	9
Hungarian Albums (MAHASZ)	30
Irish Albums (IRMA)	1
Italian Albums (FIMI)	37
New Zealand Albums (RMNZ)	1
Polish Albums (ZPAV)	21
Swedish Albums (Sverigetopplistan)	4
Swiss Albums (Schweizer Hitparade)	9
UK Albums (OCC)	1
US Billboard 200	21

2015 year-end chart performance for x
Chart (2015)	Position
Australian Albums (ARIA)	2
Austrian Albums (Ö3 Austria)	26
Belgian Albums (Ultratop Flanders)	20
Belgian Albums (Ultratop Wallonia)	34
Canadian Albums (Billboard)	2
Danish Albums (Hitlisten)	3
Dutch Albums (MegaCharts)	12
French Albums (SNEP)	25
German Albums (Offizielle Top 100)	9
Hungarian Albums (MAHASZ)	13
Irish Albums (IRMA)	2
Italian Albums (FIMI)	29
Mexican Albums (AMPROFON)	48
New Zealand Albums (RMNZ)	2
Polish Albums (ZPAV)	8
Spanish Albums (PROMUSICAE)	31
Swedish Albums (Sverigetopplistan)	2
Swiss Albums (Schweizer Hitparade)	4
UK Albums (OCC)	2
US Billboard 200	2

2016 year-end chart performance for x
Chart (2016)	Position
Australian Albums (ARIA)	20
Canadian Albums (Billboard)	15
Danish Albums (Hitlisten)	7
Dutch Albums (MegaCharts)	15
German Albums (Offizielle Top 100)	93
Hungarian Albums (MAHASZ)	36
Icelandic Albums (Plötutíóindi)	96
New Zealand Albums (RMNZ)	3
Spanish Albums (PROMUSICAE)	70
Swedish Albums (Sverigetopplistan)	20
Swiss Albums (Schweizer Hitparade)	54
UK Albums (OCC)	20
US Billboard 200	37

2017 year-end chart performance for x
Chart (2017)	Position
Australian Albums (ARIA)	7
Austrian Albums (Ö3 Austria)	41
Canadian Albums (Billboard)	34
Danish Albums (Hitlisten)	6
Dutch Albums (MegaCharts)	8
German Albums (Offizielle Top 100)	45
Icelandic Albums (Plötutíóindi)	39
Italian Albums (FIMI)	47
New Zealand Albums (RMNZ)	8
Polish Albums (ZPAV)	7
Swedish Albums (Sverigetopplistan)	15
Swiss Albums (Schweizer Hitparade)	33
UK Albums (OCC)	6
US Billboard 200	50

2018 year-end chart performance for x
Chart (2018)	Position
Australian Albums (ARIA)	10
Canadian Albums (Billboard)	39
Danish Albums (Hitlisten)	14
Dutch Albums (MegaCharts)	30
Icelandic Albums (Plötutíóindi)	59
Irish Albums (IRMA)	10
Italian Albums (FIMI)	100
New Zealand Albums (RMNZ)	14
Swedish Albums (Sverigetopplistan)	37
Swiss Albums (Schweizer Hitparade)	67
UK Albums (OCC)	22
US Billboard 200	63

2019 year-end chart performance for x
Chart (2019)	Position
Australian Albums (ARIA)	33
Belgian Albums (Ultratop Flanders)	93
Danish Albums (Hitlisten)	30
Dutch Albums (Album Top 100)	50
Icelandic Albums (Plötutíóindi)	74
Irish Albums (IRMA)	41
Latvian Albums (LAIPA)	86
New Zealand Albums (RMNZ)	25
Swedish Albums (Sverigetopplistan)	79
UK Albums (OCC)	41

2020 year-end chart performance for x
Chart (2020)	Position
Australian Albums (ARIA)	61
Danish Albums (Hitlisten)	45
Dutch Albums (Album Top 100)	82
Irish Albums (IRMA)	49
UK Albums (OCC)	52

2021 year-end chart performance for x
Chart (2021)	Position
Australian Albums (ARIA)	59
Belgian Albums (Ultratop Flanders)	120
Danish Albums (Hitlisten)	38
Dutch Albums (Album Top 100)	70
Irish Albums (IRMA)	50
Swedish Albums (Sverigetopplistan)	95
UK Albums (OCC)	55

2022 year-end chart performance for x
Chart (2022)	Position
Australian Albums (ARIA)	78
Belgian Albums (Ultratop Flanders)	115
Danish Albums (Hitlisten)	43
Dutch Albums (Album Top 100)	74
UK Albums (OCC)	62

2023 year-end chart performance for x
Chart (2023)	Position
Australian Albums (ARIA)	73
Belgian Albums (Ultratop Flanders)	185
Danish Albums (Hitlisten)	94

2024 year-end chart performance for x
Chart (2024)	Position
Belgian Albums (Ultratop Flanders)	195

2025 year-end chart performance for x
Chart (2025)	Position
Belgian Albums (Ultratop Flanders)	163
Dutch Albums (Album Top 100)	100

=== Decade-end charts ===
Decade-end chart performance for x
Chart (2010–2019)	Position
Australian Albums (ARIA)	5
German Albums (Offizielle Top 100)	18
UK Albums (OCC)	3
US Billboard 200	8

== Certifications ==
Certifications for x
Region	Certification	Certified units/sales
Australia (ARIA)	10× Platinum	700,000^{‡}
Austria (IFPI Austria)	3× Platinum	45,000^{*}
Belgium (BRMA)	Gold	15,000^{‡}
Canada (Music Canada)	Diamond	800,000^{‡}
Denmark (IFPI Danmark)	11× Platinum	220,000^{‡}
Finland (Musiikkituottajat)	Platinum	19,618
France (SNEP)	2× Platinum	200,000^{*}
Germany (BVMI)	4× Platinum	800,000^{‡}
Hungary (MAHASZ)	Platinum	2,000^{^}
Italy (FIMI)	3× Platinum	150,000^{‡}
Japan (RIAJ)	Gold	100,000^{^}
Mexico (AMPROFON)	Gold	30,000^{^}
Netherlands (NVPI)	Gold	25,000^{^}
New Zealand (RMNZ)	17× Platinum	255,000^{‡}
Norway (IFPI Norway)	Gold	15,000^{‡}
Poland (ZPAV)	Diamond	100,000^{‡}
Portugal (AFP)	Platinum	15,000^{^}
Singapore (RIAS)	4× Platinum	40,000^{*}
Spain (Promusicae)	Platinum	40,000^{‡}
Sweden (GLF)	Platinum	40,000^{‡}
Switzerland (IFPI Switzerland)	2× Platinum	40,000^{^}
United Kingdom (BPI)	13× Platinum	4,025,007
United States (RIAA)	6× Platinum	6,000,000^{‡}
Summaries
Europe (IFPI)	2× Platinum	2,000,000^{*}
^{*} Sales figures based on certification alone.^{^} Shipments figures based on certification alone.^{‡} Sales+streaming figures based on certification alone.

== Release history ==
Release history and formats for x
Region	Date	Edition	Format	Label	Ref.
Australia	20 June 2014	Standard; deluxe	CD; Digital download	Warner Bros.	
Germany	20 June 2014	Standard; deluxe	CD; Digital download	Warner Bros.	
New Zealand	20 June 2014	Standard; deluxe	CD; Digital download	Warner Bros.	
United Kingdom	23 June 2014	Standard; deluxe	CD; Digital download	Warner Bros.	
United States	23 June 2014	Standard; deluxe	CD; Digital download	Warner Bros.	
France	24 November 2014	Collector edition	2CD	Warner Bros.	
Various	13 November 2015	Wembley edition	CD/DVD; Digital download	Warner Bros.	

== See also ==
- List of best-selling albums in Australia
- List of number-one albums of 2014 (Australia)
- List of Billboard 200 number-one albums of 2014
- List of UK Albums Chart number ones of 2014
- List of UK Albums Chart number ones of 2015
