= Nina (Ed Sheeran song) =

Song by Ed Sheeran

from the album x
- Released: 20 June 2014
- Genre: Acoustic hip hop; folk pop
- Length: 3:45
- Label: Asylum; Atlantic
- Songwriters: Ed Sheeran; Johnny McDaid
- Producer: Jake Gosling

"Nina" is a song written by English singer-songwriter Ed Sheeran and Northern Irish singer Johnny McDaid. It was recorded by the former for his second studio album, x (2014), and it appeared as the sixth track. The song was produced by Jake Gosling. "Nina" samples elements of "Welcome to My World" by Wretch 32, written by Jermaine Scott, Isra Andja-Diumi Lohata and Jay Lee Robert Hippolyte.

== Background ==
Sheeran wrote this with Johnny McDaid of Snow Patrol when the pair first got together in 2013 in Nashville, Tennessee to work on tracks for Sheeran's then-upcoming studio album "x". "The first song we wrote together was 'Nina,' a love song about heartbreak, both self-inflicted and otherwise, where he basically calls someone up and advises her not to be with him," McDaid told Billboard magazine. "That sort of self-deprecating diary is pretty honest. Most people are fearful of being naked in front of the world, and afraid to expose their weaknesses. Ed isn't."

The pair became close friends and moved to Los Angeles together to continue working on x. Sheeran introduced McDaid to Courteney Cox, who became the girlfriend of the Snow Patrol member. Sheeran penned this about Scottish singer-songwriter Nina Nesbitt, who toured with him and also had a small cameo role in his "Drunk" video. The pair were also romantically involved for around a year. Sheeran explained during a Spotify track by track: "When you're a musician and you date someone, there's always an in-between. Like, you put your family and your friends first, always, and then your career second. But when you date someone, they kind of fall in between the family and friends and career, and you don't really know whether they're more important than the career or whether they're more important than family - so this is a song about that."

"You just need to find someone that's OK with it, and I think by the time you have kids, that's when your family comes first, and that's where the woman comes, because she's your family now," he added. "I think kids change everything, but up until then it's different. My family understand I had to go away for 12 months last year, but until you find a partner who'd happy with that, you shouldn't even bother. Well, you shouldn't bother committing." The song is based on a sample of the piano from Wretch 32's "Welcome To My World," which is a track from the British rapper's third mixtape, Retrospective.

== Critical reception ==
In a Billboard track-by-track review, writer Jason Lipshutz stated: "Following the quick name-check of Stevie Wonder and Bon Iver's "Re: Stacks," Sheeran once again tries to hide away from the world with a girl, but the (music) world keeps pulling him away from love. With descending piano notes and a rollicking pop hook, this one should be earmarked as a future single."

== Composition ==
"Nina" is written in the key of F-sharp minor with the tempo of 92 BPM.

== Credits and personnel ==
Credits adapted from x album liner notes:

- Ed Sheeran – lead vocals, acoustic guitar, electric guitar, handclaps, songwriting
- Jake Gosling – production, engineering, programming, drums, percussion, piano and handclaps
- Johnny McDaid – songwriting
- Geoff Swan – engineering
- Mark "Spike" Stent – mixing
- Ruadhri Cushnan – mixing
- Stuart Hawkes – mastering
- Matthew Gooderham – assistant engineer
- Ed Howard – handclaps
- Chris Leonard – guitars, handclaps, and bass guitar

== Charts ==
Chart (2014)	Peak position
Ireland (IRMA)	75
UK Singles (Official Charts Company)	57

== Certifications ==
Region	Certification	Certified units/sales
Canada (Music Canada)	Gold	40,000^{‡}
Denmark (IFPI Danmark)	Gold	45,000^{‡}
New Zealand (RMNZ)	Gold	15,000^{‡}
United Kingdom (BPI)	Gold	400,000^{‡}
^{‡} Sales+streaming figures based on certification alone.
