= Don't (Ed Sheeran song) =

Single by Ed Sheeran

from the album ×
- B-side: "Friends"
- Released: 14 August 2014
- Recorded: 2013–2014
- Genre: R&B
- Length: 3:42
- Label: Asylum; Atlantic
- Songwriters: Ed Sheeran; Benjamin Levin
- Producers: Rick Rubin; Benny Blanco

Ed Sheeran singles chronology
"Sing" (2014)	"Don't" (2014)	"Thinking Out Loud" (2014)

Music video
- "Don't" on YouTube

"Don't" is a song by the English singer-songwriter, Ed Sheeran, for his second studio album, × (2014). Written by Sheeran and Benny Blanco and produced by Blanco and Rick Rubin, the song samples "Don't Mess with My Man" by Lucy Pearl. It was initially planned as the album's lead single, but was passed over in favour of "Sing". It was instead released to iTunes on 13 June 2014 as the second "instant grat" promotional single from ×.

"Don't" peaked at No. 8 on the UK Singles Chart. In the US, it became Sheeran's first top 10 single. It also made the top 10 in eight other countries.

== Background and composition ==
The song developed from a riff which Sheeran had on his phone for a year. Sheeran first recorded the track with producer Benny Blanco, who was also credited as co-writer under his real name, Benjamin Levin. Sheeran recorded it again with Rick Rubin. The two producers produced the final cut. "Don't" is an R&B song with a "blue-eyed soul hymn".

The lyrics consist of three verses, about which Sheeran elaborated: "The first verse is the setup, the second explains the situation, and the third is the outcome, with a chorus in between each." A lyrical screed, it alludes a short-lived relationship Sheeran had with another singer. He sings: "For me and her, we make money the same way/ Four cities, two planes in the same day." Sheeran scorned the former girl for having sex with another guy, and used an expletive in the line "Don't fuck with my love". Sheeran revealed he wrote the song out of frustration, and, story-wise, the lyrics are self-explanatory. He recalled the events that inspired his writing: "[...] it was one of those situations where someone comes across as a very, very sweet, innocent person, and you take that for granted, then stuff unravels and you see a different side to them." The song was therapeutic because writing it made him feel better afterwards.

About his other songs, Sheeran has openly stated who inspired the lyrical content. But since the release of "Don't", he has remained silent about the subject of the song. On 31 October 2015, Fuse posted an interview in which Sheeran says, "'Don't' is just a song that's close to the bone and definitely opened up a door that I probably shouldn't have opened up. [...] I just won't say who it's about because... I mean everyone, everyone fucking knows anyway. But like I just won't say who it's about cause it's quite a negative song." It has been rumored to be about English singer Ellie Goulding, but Goulding has denied these rumors and stated that she and Sheeran were never in a relationship.

"Don't" is written in the key of F minor with a tempo of 92 beats per minute.

== Release and reception ==
Sheeran did not intend to release the song on the album, because the lyrics were therapeutic and personal. He was however persuaded by those who had heard the song to release it, as it was "an alright song". He revealed that "the more [he] listened back [he] thought this is an alright song".

"Don't" was planned to be released as the first single from the album until March 2014, when "Sing" was chosen. Billboard speculated that the provocative, "Don't fuck with my love", chorus prompted the change. Sheeran debuted a snippet of the song in a commercial for Beats by Dr. Dre in May 2014.

On 13 June 2014, "Don't" was made available to customers, who pre-ordered ×, as the second "instant grat" promotional single, following "One", and an official audio stream was released on Sheeran's YouTube page. An extended play accompanied the release of the single, featuring a remix by Rick Ross, a live cover of Nina Simone's "Be My Husband", and a non-album song, "Everything You Are". Notably, Sheeran's lyrics aren't censored on the Rick Ross remix, but are on the album version. "Don't" officially impacted US contemporary hit radio on 15 July 2014.

Jason Lipshutz of Billboard wrote: "[...] 'Don't' shows that Sheeran is not afraid to be dangerous, or even explicit, on his sophomore set."

== Commercial performance ==
In the UK, the song reached No. 8 on the UK Singles Chart on its ninth week on the chart. As of September 2017, the song sold 399,000 copies in actual sales, and it also has 67 million streams, giving a total of 1,073,000 combined units in the UK.

In the US, "Don't" reached No. 9 on the all-encompassing Billboard Hot 100 chart; it marked Sheeran's first single to reach the top 10 on that chart. As of January 2015, the single sold 1,464,000 digital copies in the US.

== Music video ==
An accompanying music video was released on YouTube on 4 August 2014. The video was directed by Emil Nava and follows a dancer (Phillip Chbeeb from I.aM.mE) going from poverty to wealth. Sheeran makes a brief drive-by cameo appearance. 4Music called it a "compelling watch".

== Live performances ==
On 12 April 2014, Sheeran performed "Don't" on Saturday Night Live. On 17 September 2014, Sheeran sang it during the season 9 finale of America's Got Talent. On 6 February 2015, Sheeran performed the song on The Late Late Show; he was accompanied by John Mayer on the guitar.

== Formats and track listings ==
Digital download
No.	Title	Length
1.	"Don't"	3:39

CD single
No.	Title	Length
1.	"Don't"	3:39
2.	"Friends"	3:10

Digital download – extended play
No.	Title	Length
1.	"Don't" (Rick Ross Remix)	4:17
2.	"Be My Husband" (Live from Glastonbury)	7:50
3.	"Everything You Are"	3:58
4.	"Friends"	3:10

Digital download – UK extended play
No.	Title	Length
1.	"Don't" (Rick Ross Remix)	4:17
2.	"Be My Husband" (Live from Glastonbury)	7:50
3.	"Everything You Are"	3:58

== Charts ==
=== Weekly charts ===
Weekly chart performance for "Don't"
Chart (2014–2015)	Peak position
Australia (ARIA)	4
Austria (Ö3 Austria Top 40)	30
Belgium (Ultratop 50 Flanders)	43
Belgium (Ultratop 50 Wallonia)	48
Canada Hot 100 (Billboard)	7
Canada AC (Billboard)	24
Canada CHR/Top 40 (Billboard)	3
Canada Hot AC (Billboard)	2
Czech Republic Airplay (ČNS IFPI)	13
Czech Republic Singles Digital (ČNS IFPI)	10
Denmark (Tracklisten)	8
Euro Digital Songs (Billboard)	7
Finland (Suomen virallinen lista)	17
France (SNEP)	41
Germany (GfK)	17
Hungary (Stream Top 40)	29
Ireland (IRMA)	11
Israel International Airplay (Media Forest)	2
Lebanon (Lebanese Top 20)	14
Netherlands (Dutch Top 40)	15
Netherlands (Single Top 100)	20
New Zealand (Recorded Music NZ)	6
Poland Airplay (ZPAV)	15
Scottish Singles Sales (Official Charts)	10
Slovakia Airplay (ČNS IFPI)	31
Slovakia Singles Digital (ČNS IFPI)	13
Slovenia (SloTop50)	47
Spain (Promusicae)	43
Sweden (Sverigetopplistan)	22
Switzerland (Schweizer Hitparade)	7
UK Singles (Official Charts)	8
US Billboard Hot 100	9
US Adult Contemporary (Billboard)	24
US Adult Pop Airplay (Billboard)	3
US Country Airplay (Billboard)	59
US Dance Airplay (Billboard)	4
US Pop Airplay (Billboard)	2
US Rhythmic Airplay (Billboard)	24

=== Year-end charts ===
2014 year-end chart performance for "Don't"
Chart (2014)	Position
Australia (ARIA)	42
Canada (Canadian Hot 100)	56
Germany (Official German Charts)	50
Hungary (Stream Top 40)	99
Italy (FIMI)	66
Netherlands (Dutch Top 40)	65
Netherlands (Single Top 100)	43
New Zealand (Recorded Music NZ)	33
Sweden (Sverigetopplistan)	62
Switzerland (Schweizer Hitparade)	56
UK Singles (Official Charts Company)	27
US Billboard Hot 100	52
US Adult Top 40 (Billboard)	29
US Mainstream Top 40 (Billboard)	36

2015 year-end chart performance for "Don't"
Chart (2015)	Position
Canada (Canadian Hot 100)	72
US Billboard Hot 100	92
US Adult Top 40 (Billboard)	49
US Mainstream Top 40 (Billboard)	49

== Certifications and sales ==
Certifications and sales for "Don't"
Region	Certification	Certified units/sales
Australia (ARIA)	5× Platinum	350,000^{‡}
Austria (IFPI Austria)	Platinum	30,000^{*}
Canada (Music Canada)	6× Platinum	480,000^{‡}
Denmark (IFPI Danmark)	2× Platinum	180,000^{‡}
Germany (BVMI)	Platinum	400,000^{‡}
Italy (FIMI)	2× Platinum	100,000^{‡}
New Zealand (RMNZ)	4× Platinum	120,000^{‡}
Spain (Promusicae)	Gold	30,000^{‡}
Sweden (GLF)	Platinum	40,000^{‡}
Switzerland (IFPI Switzerland)	Platinum	30,000^{‡}
United Kingdom (BPI)	3× Platinum	1,800,000^{‡}
United States (RIAA)	5× Platinum	5,000,000^{‡}
Streaming
Denmark (IFPI Danmark)	Platinum	2,600,000^{†}
^{*} Sales figures based on certification alone.^{‡} Sales+streaming figures based on certification alone.^{†} Streaming-only figures based on certification alone.

== Release history ==
Release dates for "Don't"
Region	Date	Format
United Kingdom	14 August 2014	Contemporary hit radio
