= Tenerife Sea =

Song by Ed Sheeran

from the album x
- Released: 20 June 2014
- Studio: Shangri-La (Los Angeles, CA)
- Genre: Folk pop
- Length: 4:02
- Label: Asylum; Atlantic
- Songwriters: Ed Sheeran; Johnny McDaid; Foy Vance
- Producer: Rick Rubin

"Tenerife Sea" is a song by English singer-songwriter Ed Sheeran. It was written by Sheeran, Johnny McDaid of Snow Patrol, and Foy Vance, and produced by Rick Rubin. The song was released on 20 June 2014 as part of his second studio album, x. It entered the UK Singles Chart at number 93 and peaked at number 62.

== Background and composition ==
Sheeran wrote "Tenerife Sea" while in Nashville, the capital of the US state of Tennessee. It was inspired by the events following the 2013 Grammy Awards, wherein his single "The A Team" was nominated for Song of the Year, a first Grammy nomination for Sheeran. He lost the award to the American band Fun for its song "We Are Young". Along with his girlfriend, Sheeran attended the after-party where he, being in a new experience, felt uninterested participating in the conversations. According to Sheeran, "neither of [them] wanted to be there – you just want to be with this one person". He also told The San Francisco Examiner: "It was a very odd atmosphere, where everyone was out for themselves. And I found myself being competitive, as well, and pissed off that I didn't win, which felt very unhealthy."

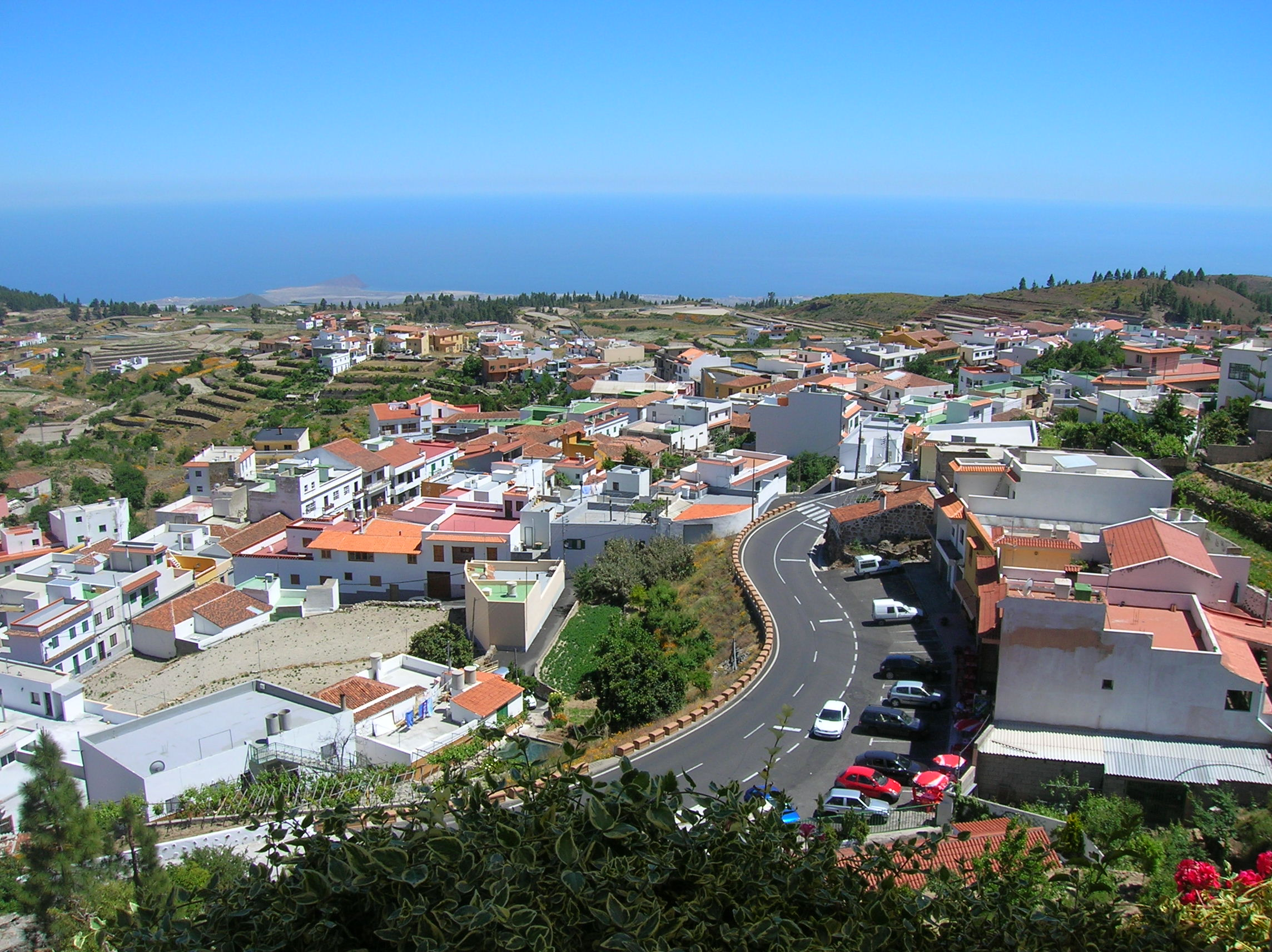
An area in Villaflor, Tenerife. Sheeran likened the hue of his girlfriend's eyes to that of the seas around Tenerife.

"Tenerife Sea" is a love song, in which Sheeran's vocals are multi-tracked. Randall Roberts of the Los Angeles Times likened the song to that of Eric Clapton's 1977 ballad "Wonderful Tonight" and Ginuwine's "In Those Jeans".

The song's title is a reference to Tenerife in the Canary Islands of Spain. According to Sheeran, the hue of his lady's eyes are as blue as the seas in Tenerife, "seriously blue, like electric blue". The lyrics speak of Sheeran's girlfriend at the time, "Beth", who he thinks of as "really pretty" in her dress. Despite rumours, the song is not actually related to fellow singer-songwriter Taylor Swift.

== Debut and response ==
"Tenerife Sea" was released on 20 June 2014 as part of Sheeran's second studio album, x, serving as its eighth track. However, the song had been performed live in both the US and Sheeran's home country prior to the parent album's release. In the US, Sheeran performed "Tenerife Sea" in October 2013 at a concert in Madison Square Garden. He also sang "Tenerife Sea" at an intimate NYC-based Mercury Lounge show, where he performed two other new songs, although recording was not allowed. On 24 March 2014, Sheeran debuted the song at London's Royal Albert Hall for the Teenage Cancer Trust benefit show. Few British media noted the song, which was thought of hinting at the same musical style Sheeran would be taking for his then-unreleased second album.

The song was particularly popular in streaming services on theme-specific playlists. In April 2015, commercial streaming company Spotify released a report of the most-streamed tracks worldwide under the category sleep. "Tenerife Sea" is placed at number 14, joining Sheeran's other 6 songs ranked in the top 20. Sleep is one of Spotify's most popular categories "that people also use for general relaxation and to help themselves unwind". The Guardian columnist Tim Dowling suggests that the report is an indication of "very popular, slightly mellow songs that keep cropping up on sleep playlists" but not a list of a "carefully curated journey to unconsciousness". In June 2015, Spotify compiled the most popular first dance songs based on an analysis of 400,000 wedding playlists worldwide. "Tenerife Sea" was the fifth most popular. On 29 June 2024 Sheeran staged his first ever concert in Tenerife as part of his "+-=/ * Mathematics" tour and included "Tenerife Sea" in his set of songs.. During his stay in Tenerife, Sheeran recorded a performance of the song whilst sitting in a fishing boat off the coast of San Andrés, near Santa Cruz de Tenerife, the island's capital. The video was published to his official YouTube channel on 11 July 2024.

== Critical and commercial reception ==
"Tenerife Sea" was noted by critics and journalists. In an article written for Valentine's Day, Marika Azzopardi of The Malta Independent compiled "some great moments of love in the arts", including "Tenerife Sea" among other songs. Azzopardi writes that Sheeran "goes all soft and summery" with the song. Jon Caramanica of The New York Times called "Tenerife Sea" an "unreserved love song". Allison Stewart of The Washington Post noted Sheeran's layered vocals, writing: "'Tenerife Sea' is lush and gorgeous, its vocals stacked to the heavens." Jim Beviglia of the American Songwriter thought that although "tidy", "Tenerife Sea" comes "toothless" compared with the "daring confessionals" Sheeran made in the album's other tracks.

Jon Dolan of the Rolling Stone called "Tenerife Sea" an "oversweet ballad". Jason Lipshutz of Billboard had the same thought, calling it a "sticky-sweet" wedding song. Writing for The Irish Times, Lauren Murphy noted that the album's few songs, including "Tenerife Sea", are "simply dull". Kitty Empire of The Guardian thinks that the song "dwells at simpering length on how wonderful a girl looks in her dress".

Due to high streaming rates, all of the album's 12 tracks, including "Tenerife Sea", entered the UK Singles Chart. The song debuted at number 93, has peaked at number 62 and spent 7 weeks on the chart. Elsewhere, "Tenerife Sea" peaked at number 53 in Ireland and number 86 in Slovakia. Although it did not appear in the overall singles chart in the US, "Tenerife Sea" entered at number 24 on the Billboard Twitter Top Tracks chart. This chart activity is ascribed to the acoustic version performed by James McVey, guitarist of the British pop group The Vamps, whose video was uploaded in YouTube.

== Credits and personnel ==
Credits adapted from x album liner notes:

- Ed Sheeran – vocals, songwriting, guitar
- Johnny McDaid – songwriting, keys
- Foy Vance – songwriting
- Rick Rubin – production
- Jason Lader – recording, bass, keys
- Sean Oakley – additional recording, recording assistance, digital editing
- Joshua Smith – recording assistance
- Eric Lynn – recording assistance, keys
- Dace Hanych – production coordination
- Ricardo Kim – production assistance
- Johnnie Burik – production assistance
- Eric Cardieux – digital editing
- Christian "Leggy" Langdon – digital editing
- Mike "Spike" Stent – mixing
- Geoff Swan – engineering
- Blake Mills – guitar
- Adam MacDougall – keys
- Chris Dave – drums
- Lenny Castro – percussion
- Luis Conte – percussion
- Stuart Hawkes – mastering

== Charts and certifications ==
=== Weekly charts ===
Weekly chart performance for "Tenerife Sea"
Chart (2014–2015)	Peak position
Czech Republic Singles Digital (ČNS IFPI)	93
Ireland (IRMA)	53
Slovakia Singles Digital (ČNS IFPI)	71
UK Singles (Official Charts)	62

=== Certifications ===
Certifications for "Tenerife Sea"
Region	Certification	Certified units/sales
Canada (Music Canada)	2× Platinum	160,000^{‡}
Denmark (IFPI Danmark)	Platinum	90,000^{‡}
Italy (FIMI)	Platinum	50,000^{‡}
New Zealand (RMNZ)	2× Platinum	60,000^{‡}
Spain (Promusicae)	Gold	30,000^{‡}
United Kingdom (BPI)	Platinum	600,000^{‡}
United States (RIAA)	Platinum	1,000,000^{‡}
^{‡} Sales+streaming figures based on certification alone.
