= Afire Love =

2014 song

Promotional single by Ed Sheeran

from the album ×
- Released: 16 June 2014
- Genre: Pop; folk; soul
- Length: 5:14
- Label: Asylum; Atlantic
- Songwriters: Ed Sheeran; Johnny McDaid; Foy Vance
- Producer: Johnny McDaid

"Afire Love" is a song recorded by English singer-songwriter Ed Sheeran for his second studio album, × (2014). The song is about Sheeran's late grandfather who suffered from Alzheimer's disease. The record, which was produced by Snow Patrol member Johnny McDaid, samples elements of "Remembering Jenny" composed by Christophe Beck for the soundtrack to the American television series Buffy the Vampire Slayer.

The song was released as an "instant grat" digital download to the iTunes Store on 16 June 2014, serving as the third of seven promotional singles from ×. Due to high streaming rates, all of the album's 12 tracks including "Afire Love" charted in the United Kingdom.

== Background and composition ==
The song is about Sheeran's late grandfather who suffered from Alzheimer's disease for 20 years. He died of the disease in December 2013, two weeks after Sheeran began writing about it. Sheeran finished writing the song at his grandfather's funeral. Prior to the release of the album, Sheeran had also paid tribute at the 2014 Grammy Awards, in which he wore a necktie belonging to his grandfather.

The lyrics discusses Sheeran's reaction to the disease as a child all the way up until his grandfather's funeral. In the verses prior to the first chorus, Sheeran recounts the circumstances present upon his grandfather's disease. For instance, he sings the moment when his grandfather lost his capability of recognizing the face of his grandson: "My father told me, son/ It's not his fault he doesn't know your face/ And you're not the only one." The chorus tells the "powerful love between his grandparents", in which his grandfather said to his grandmother: "Put your open lips on mine and slowly let them shut/ For they're designed to be together/ With your body next to mine, our hearts will beat as one/ And we're set alight, we're afire in love." The song concludes with Sheeran and his family seemingly singing "hallelujah" at the funeral.

Sheeran recorded "Afire Love" in Cocoloco studio in Los Angeles, and Sphere and Metropolis studios in London. It was produced by Snow Patrol member Johnny McDaid, and engineered by Mcdaid and Geoff Swan. The track samples elements of "Remembering Jenny", which was composed by Christophe Beck for the soundtrack to the American television series Buffy the Vampire Slayer. The ballad is piano-driven and has a "grooving" beat.

== Release and reception ==
The song was released as an "instant grat" digital download to the iTunes Store on 16 June 2014, serving as the third of seven promotional singles from his second studio album, × (2014). It was available for digital download upon pre-order of the album. It topped the iTunes chart in the United States.

Due to high streaming rates, "Afire Love" and the rest of the album's 12 tracks charted in the United Kingdom. It entered the UK Singles Chart at number 71 and rose to number 59.

Neil McCormick of The Daily Telegraph describes "Afire Love" an "anthemic singalong".

== Credits and personnel ==
Credits are taken from × liner notes:

- Vocals by Ed Sheeran
- Written by Sheeran, Johnny McDaid and Foy Vance
- Produced by Daid
- Engineered by Daid and Geoff Swan
- Mixed by Mark "Spike" Stent
- Mastered by Stuart Hawkes
- Contains elements from "Remembering Jenny" composed by Christophe Beck for Buffy The Vampire Slayer
- Guitar by Sheeran
- Guitar, Bass, Backing vocals, Percussion, Piano, Programming and Hammond by McDaid
- Drums by Geoff Leaa
- Live Strings by Davide Rossi
- Backing vocals by Foy Vance
- Additional vocals and gang percussion by Coco Arquette, Courteney Cox, and Eamon Harkin

== Charts ==
Chart (2014)	Peak position
Belgium (Ultratop 50 Flanders)	46
Belgium (Ultratop 50 Wallonia)	44
Canada Hot 100 (Billboard)	41
Denmark (Tracklisten)	5
Euro Digital Song Sales (Billboard)	5
France (SNEP)	37
Ireland (IRMA)	82
Ireland (Ireland Digital Songs)	2
Netherlands (Single Top 100)	38
Portugal (Portugal Digital Songs)	9
Spain (Promusicae)	40
Sweden (Sweden Digital Songs)	5
UK Singles (Official Charts Company)	59
US Billboard Hot 100	37

== Certifications ==
Region	Certification	Certified units/sales
Canada (Music Canada)	Platinum	80,000^{‡}
Denmark (IFPI Danmark)	Gold	45,000^{‡}
New Zealand (RMNZ)	Gold	15,000^{‡}
United Kingdom (BPI)	Gold	400,000^{‡}
United States (RIAA)	Gold	500,000^{‡}
^{‡} Sales+streaming figures based on certification alone.
