= Sing (Ed Sheeran song) =

Single by Ed Sheeran

from the album ×
- B-side: "Friends"
- Released: 7 April 2014
- Recorded: 7 December 2013
- Genre: R&B
- Length: 3:55
- Label: Asylum UK
- Songwriters: Ed Sheeran; Pharrell Williams
- Producer: Pharrell Williams

Ed Sheeran singles chronology
"I See Fire" (2013)	"Sing" (2014)	"Don't" (2014)

Audio sample
- "Sing": file; help

"Sing" is a song written and recorded by English singer-songwriter, Ed Sheeran. It was produced by Pharrell Williams, who also provided backing vocals. The song was released by Asylum Records UK on 7 April 2014 as the lead single from Sheeran's second studio album, × (2014). "Sing" became Sheeran's first UK number-one single and also topped the charts in Australia, New Zealand and Ireland. It peaked at number 13 on the US Billboard Hot 100.

A remix featuring French rapper Nekfeu was released on 11 August 2014.

== Background ==
"Sing" was written by Sheeran and Pharrell Williams, and produced by the latter. Williams also provides uncredited background vocals during the chorus. The song has a length of 3 minutes and 55 seconds. The song, which has pop and R&B influences and was inspired by Justin Timberlake, is a departure from the folk rock sound Sheeran became known for on his previous album, +. Sheeran was inspired to model the song after the pop and R&B stylings of Timberlake, stating "It was pretty close to a direct inspiration. I love Justified and FutureSex/LoveSounds, so I took inspiration from those." The lyrics are about "a night out in Vegas."

"Sing" was released in the United Kingdom, Ireland, Australia and Germany in May 2014. Aside from these nations, "Sing" was released internationally on 7 April 2014, during a YouTube live chat with Sheeran. "Friends", a track from the EP, entered the UK Singles Chart at No. 121.

== Critical reception ==
The song received critical acclaim upon release; music critics complimented Sheeran's change of sound, and likened the song to the works of Justin Timberlake. Time gave the song a very positive review, saying that it is "more of a departure. It fits the times nicely: there's some of fellow Brit, Sam Smith, in Sheeran's rubbery falsetto, plus some of Robin Thicke's ubiquitous 'Blurred Lines' in the percussion. But Sheeran's really got his heavy-breathing, hyper-flirtatious sights on another, older target: Justin Timberlake's solo debut, 'Like I Love You'." The chorus riff and falsetto are from "Miss You" by The Rolling Stones.

In a positive review, The Guardian said that "while Pharrell's influence is writ large, there's enough of Sheeran there to prevent it coming across as horrible pastiche." The Hollywood Reporter also gave the song a positive review, stating that "Sheeran's fragile voice, as heard on past hits like 'The A Team' and 'Lego House,' has now morphed into a confident croon, unafraid of diving into a deep bag of melismas, boisterous chants and rapid-fire rhymes in order to convince his female subject of his desires."

== Chart performance ==
The song debuted at No. 1 on the UK Singles Chart and Irish Singles Chart, giving him his first ever number-one singles in both the United Kingdom and Ireland. The song has sold 670,000 copies in actual sales in the United Kingdom, which together with 66 million in streams give a combine total units of 1,339,000.

"Sing" debuted at No. 1 on the Australian ARIA Charts in May 2014, making it Sheeran's first ever number-one in the country, and his sixth top ten single in Australia. On the week of 14 April 2014, the song entered the New Zealand Singles Chart at No. 8, becoming his fourth top 10 single and second top 10 debut in New Zealand. The song has since topped the charts in that country, giving Sheeran his second consecutive number-one single there. In Italy, "Sing" has peaked at No. 2 and spent five total weeks at this position, giving him the higher peak position reached in the country, so far.

In Canada, the track has since peaked at No. 4, giving Sheeran his first ever top 10 hit in the country. "Sing" debuted at No. 15 on the Billboard Hot 100, giving Sheeran his highest-charting single in the United States, at the time. The single managed to sell 123,000 copies, giving him his second best sales week digitally; the song also managed to net 563,000 streams and earn 28 million in audience impressions, all before its debut week on the Billboard Hot 100. "Sing" has since peaked at No. 13 on the Billboard Hot 100. The song reached the 2 million sales mark in the US in July 2016, and has sold 1,323,000 copies as of January 2015.

== Music video ==
The music video for "Sing" was released exclusively to Sheeran's Facebook page on 22 May 2014, and added to Vevo and YouTube on 23 May, exactly a month before the album was released. It follows a puppet caricature of Sheeran on a night out, during which he gets drunk, steals a mic (from actor Peter Kwong from Big Trouble in Little China) and sings karaoke, goes to a strip club and picks up Sheeran and Pharrell from a studio in his truck. Throughout the video Sheeran is seen playing his guitar in front of an optical illusion-esque backdrop.

The puppet is currently in Sheeran's safekeeping, but he has "no idea how to work it yet". The puppet was closely modelled on him, down to his clothes and tattoos. Sheeran and Pharrell received the award for Best Male Video at the 2014 MTV Video Music Awards for the video.

The video is directed by Emil Nava.

== Live performances and cover versions ==
Sheeran performed the song live for the first time on Saturday Night Live on 12 April 2014, along with his unreleased, next single, "Don't", which he debuted off the album. Sheeran also performed "Sing" on The Ellen DeGeneres Show on 16 May 2014, on the Britain's Got Talent semi-final on 27 May 2014, on The Graham Norton Show on 6 June 2014, and on Jimmy Kimmel Live! on 28 August 2014.

== Formats and track listings ==
Digital download
No.	Title	Length
1.	"Sing"	3:55

CD single
No.	Title	Length
1.	"Sing"	3:55
2.	"Sing" (Live @ 1LIVE Radiokonzert)	6:49

Digital download – extended play
No.	Title	Length
1.	"Sing" (Live @ 1LIVE Radiokonzert)	6:49
2.	"Sing" (Trippy Turtle Remix)	4:06
3.	"Friends"	3:10

== Charts ==
=== Weekly charts ===
Weekly chart performance for "Sing"
Chart (2014–2015)	Peak position
Australia (ARIA)	1
Austria (Ö3 Austria Top 40)	11
Belgium (Ultratop 50 Flanders)	26
Belgium (Ultratop 50 Wallonia)	19
Canada Hot 100 (Billboard)	4
Canada AC (Billboard)	1
Canada CHR/Top 40 (Billboard)	4
Canada Hot AC (Billboard)	1
Czech Republic Airplay (ČNS IFPI)	12
Czech Republic Singles Digital (ČNS IFPI)	9
Denmark (Tracklisten)	15
Euro Digital Song Sales (Billboard)	1
Finland (Suomen virallinen lista)	17
France (SNEP)	5
Germany (GfK)	7
Hungary (Rádiós Top 40)	3
Hungary (Single Top 40)	9
Hungary (Stream Top 40)	17
Ireland (IRMA)	1
Israel International Airplay (Media Forest)	1
Italy (FIMI)	2
Japan Hot 100 (Billboard)	14
Lebanon (OLT20)	9
Mexico (Billboard Mexican Airplay)	35
Mexico Anglo (Monitor Latino)	15
Netherlands (Dutch Top 40)	15
Netherlands (Single Top 100)	12
New Zealand (Recorded Music NZ)	1
Poland Airplay (ZPAV)	18
Poland Dance (ZPAV)	44
Scottish Singles Sales (Official Charts)	1
Slovakia Airplay (ČNS IFPI)	24
Slovakia Singles Digital (ČNS IFPI)	6
Slovenia (SloTop50)	17
Spain (Promusicae)	24
Sweden (Sverigetopplistan)	22
Switzerland (Schweizer Hitparade)	7
UK Singles (Official Charts)	1
US Billboard Hot 100	13
US Adult Contemporary (Billboard)	14
US Adult Pop Airplay (Billboard)	4
US Dance Airplay (Billboard)	23
US Pop Airplay (Billboard)	6
US Rhythmic Airplay (Billboard)	25

=== Year-end charts ===
Year-end chart performance for "Sing"
Chart (2014)	Position
Australia (ARIA)	33
Austria (Ö3 Austria Top 40)	67
Belgium (Ultratop 50 Flanders)	88
Belgium (Ultratop 50 Wallonia)	70
Brazil (Crowley)	80
Canada (Canadian Hot 100)	31
Germany (Official German Charts)	44
Hungary (Rádiós Top 40)	25
Hungary (Single Top 40)	55
Hungary (Stream Top 40)	58
Ireland (IRMA)	16
Italy (FIMI)	33
Japan Adult Contemporary (Billboard)	24
Netherlands (Dutch Top 40)	67
Netherlands (Single Top 100)	40
New Zealand (Recorded Music NZ)	17
Sweden (Sverigetopplistan)	97
Switzerland (Schweizer Hitparade)	43
UK Singles (OCC)	11
US Billboard Hot 100	56
US Adult Contemporary (Billboard)	42
US Adult Top 40 (Billboard)	26
US Mainstream Top 40 (Billboard)	42

=== Decade-end charts ===
Decade-end chart performance for "Sing"
Chart (2010–2019)	Position
UK Singles (OCC)	83

== Certifications ==
Certifications for "Sing"
Region	Certification	Certified units/sales
Australia (ARIA)	3× Platinum	210,000^{‡}
Austria (IFPI Austria)	Gold	15,000^{*}
Canada (Music Canada)	4× Platinum	320,000^{‡}
Germany (BVMI)	Gold	150,000^{‡}
Italy (FIMI)	2× Platinum	60,000^{‡}
New Zealand (RMNZ)	3× Platinum	45,000^{*}
Spain (Promusicae)	Gold	20,000^{‡}
Sweden (GLF)	Platinum	40,000^{‡}
Switzerland (IFPI Switzerland)	Platinum	30,000^{‡}
United Kingdom (BPI)	3× Platinum	1,800,000^{‡}
United States (RIAA)	3× Platinum	3,000,000^{‡}
Streaming
Denmark (IFPI Danmark)	Platinum	2,600,000^{†}
Spain (Promusicae)	Gold	4,000,000^{†}
^{*} Sales figures based on certification alone.^{‡} Sales+streaming figures based on certification alone.^{†} Streaming-only figures based on certification alone.

== Release history ==
Region	Date	Label	Format
Australia	7 April 2014	Asylum; Atlantic	Digital download (single)
Germany	7 April 2014	Asylum; Atlantic	Digital download (single)
Ireland	7 April 2014	Asylum; Atlantic	Digital download (single)
New Zealand	7 April 2014	Asylum; Atlantic	Digital download (single)
Ireland	30 May 2014	Asylum; Atlantic	Digital download (EP)
United Kingdom	1 June 2014	Asylum; Atlantic	Digital download (single)
