= List of awards and nominations received by Ed Sheeran =

Ed Sheeran awards and nominations
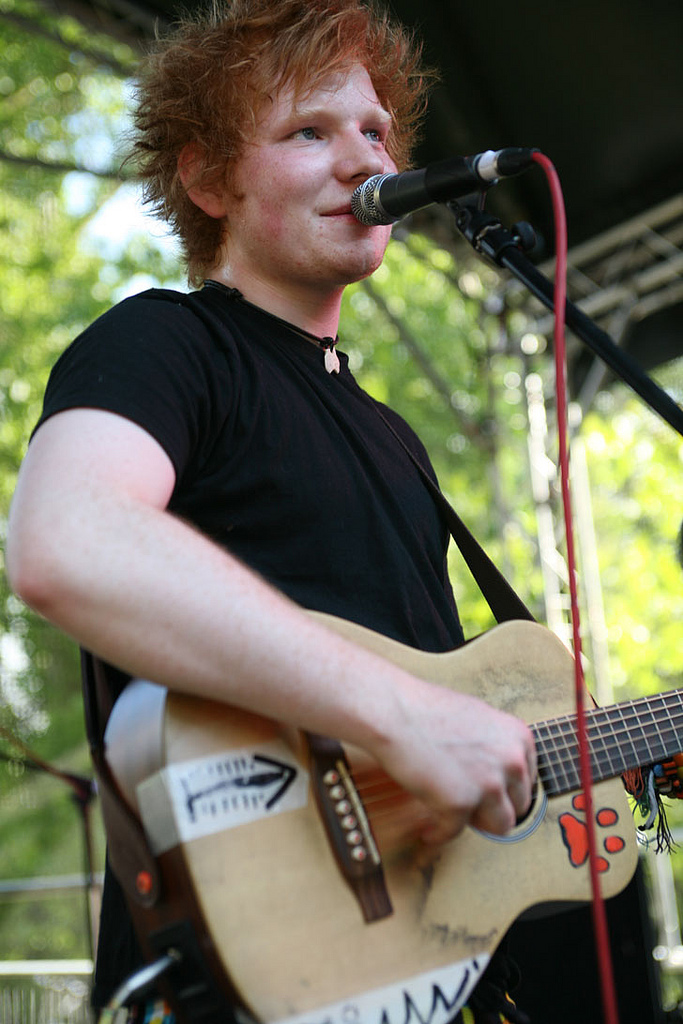
- Sheeran performing at Ipswich Arts Festival 2010
Awards and nominations
Award	Wins	Nominations
American Music Awards	2	18
ARIA	0	9
Billboard	8	26
Brit	7	22
Grammy	4	15
MOBO	0	5
MTV Europe	5	16
MTV VMA	2	22
Much	3	8
Teen Choice	6	14
World Music	2	5
Goldene Kamera	1	1
iHeartRadio Music Awards	4	15

Totals (Note: Certain award groups do not simply award one winner. They acknowledge several different recipients, have runners-up, and have third place. Since this is a specific recognition and is different from losing an award, runner-up mentions are considered wins in this award tally. For simplification and to avoid errors, each award in this list has been presumed to have had a prior nomination.)
- Wins: 185
- Nominations: 467

Ed Sheeran is an English singer-songwriter. He began recording in 2005 and moved to London in 2008 to pursue a music career. In early 2011, he released his eighth independent extended play, No. 5 Collaborations Project; with it, Sheeran gained mainstream attention. Three months later, Sheeran was signed to Asylum/Atlantic Records.

Sheeran broke through commercially in June 2011, when his debut single, "The A Team", debuted at No. 3 on the UK Singles Chart. Buoyed by the chart success of the singles, "The A Team" and "Lego House", his debut album, +, has been certified sextuple platinum in the United Kingdom. In 2012, he won a Brit Award for British Male Solo Artist and Breakthrough Act, while "The A Team" also won the Ivor Novello Award for Best Song Musically and Lyrically.

== 4Music Video Honours ==
Year	Nominee / work	Award	Result	Ref.
2011	Ed Sheeran	Best Breakthrough	Nominated	
2012	"Drunk"	Best Video	Nominated	
2014	Ed Sheeran	Best Boy	Nominated	

== African Entertainment Awards USA ==
Year	Award	Nomination	Result	Ref
2022	International Artist of the Year	Ed Sheeran	Nominated	
2022	Collaboration of the Year	"Peru" (with Fireboy DML)	Nominated	

== All Africa Music Awards ==
Year	Award	Nomination	Result	Ref
2022	Best Global Act	Ed Sheeran	Nominated	
2022	Song of The Year	"Peru" (with Fireboy DML)	Nominated	
2022	Best African Collaboration	"Peru" (with Fireboy DML)	Nominated	

== American Music Awards ==
Year	Nominee / work	Award	Result	Ref
2015	Ed Sheeran	Artist of the Year	Nominated	
2015	Ed Sheeran	Favorite Pop/Rock Male Artist	Won	
2015	Ed Sheeran	Favorite Adult Contemporary Artist	Nominated	
2015	x	Favorite Pop/Rock Album	Nominated	
2015	"Thinking Out Loud"	Single of the Year	Nominated	
2017	Ed Sheeran	Artist of the Year	Nominated	
2017	Ed Sheeran	Favorite Pop/Rock Male Artist	Nominated	
2017	Ed Sheeran	Favorite Adult Contemporary Artist	Nominated	
2017	"Shape of You"	Favorite Pop/Rock Song	Nominated	
2017	"Shape of You"	Video of the Year	Nominated	
2018	Ed Sheeran	Artist of the Year	Nominated	
2018	Ed Sheeran	Favorite Pop/Rock Male Artist	Nominated	
2018	Ed Sheeran	Favorite Adult Contemporary Artist	Nominated	
2018	"Perfect"	Favorite Pop/Rock Song	Nominated	
2018	÷	Favorite Pop/Rock Album	Nominated	
2018	÷ Tour	Tour of the Year	Nominated	
2019	÷ Tour	Tour of the Year	Nominated	
2021	Ed Sheeran	Favorite Pop/Rock Male Artist	Won	
2022	Ed Sheeran	Favorite Pop/Rock Male Artist	Nominated	
2022	Ed Sheeran	Tour of the Year	Nominated	

== APRA Awards ==
Year	Nominee / work	Award	Result
2013	"Lego House"	Most Performed International Work of the Year	Nominated
2017	"Love Yourself"	Most Performed International Work of the Year	Nominated
2018	"Castle on the Hill"	Most Performed International Work of the Year	Nominated
2018	"Shape of You"	Most Performed International Work of the Year	Won
2023	"Shivers"	Most Performed International Work of the Year	Nominated

== ARIA Music Awards ==
Year	Nominee / work	Award	Result	Lost to	Ref.
2012	+	Best International Artist	Nominated	One Direction – Up All Night	
2013	+	Best International Artist	Nominated	One Direction – Take Me Home	
2014	x	Best International Artist	Nominated	One Direction – Midnight Memories	
2015	x	Best International Artist	Nominated	One Direction – Four	
2017	÷ & Loose Change	Best International Artist	Nominated	Harry Styles – Harry Styles	
2018	÷	Best International Artist	Nominated	Camila Cabello – Camila	
2019	No.6 Collaborations Project	Best International Artist	Nominated	Taylor Swift – Lover	
2022	=	Best International Artist	Nominated	Harry Styles – Harry's House	
2023	−	Best International Artist	Nominated	Taylor Swift – Midnights	

== BBC Music Awards ==
Year	Nominee / work	Award	Result	Ref.
2014	Ed Sheeran	British Artist of the Year	Won	
2014	"Sing"	Song of the Year	Nominated	
2015	Ed Sheeran	British Artist of the Year	Nominated	
2015	"Bloodstream"	Song of the Year	Nominated	
2017	Ed Sheeran	Artist of the Year	Nominated	
2017	÷	British Album of the Year	Nominated	

== BBC Radio 1's Teen Awards ==
Year	Nominee / work	Award	Result	Ref.
2011	"The A Team"	Best British Single	Won	
2014	Ed Sheeran	Best British Solo Act	Won	
2015	Ed Sheeran	Best British Solo Act	Won	
2017	Ed Sheeran	Best British Solo Act	Won	
2018	Ed Sheeran	Best British Solo Act	Won	
2018	"Perfect Duet" (with Beyoncé)	Best Single	Nominated	

== Berlin Music Video Awards ==
Year	Nominated work	Category	Result
2020	"CROSS ME"	Best VFX	Nominated
2023	"2STEP" (FEAT. LIL BABY)	Best VFX	Nominated
2026	"Azizam"	Best Concept	Nominated

== Billboard Latin Music Awards ==
Year	Nominee / work	Award	Result	Ref.
2016	Ed Sheeran	Crossover Artist of the Year	Nominated	
2022	Ed Sheeran	Crossover Artist of the Year	Nominated	

== Billboard Music Awards ==
Year	Nominee / work	Award	Result	Ref.
2015	Ed Sheeran	Top Male Artist	Nominated	
2015	Ed Sheeran	Top Billboard 200 Artist	Nominated	
2015	Ed Sheeran	Top Radio Songs Artist	Nominated	
2015	Ed Sheeran	Top Digital Songs Artist	Nominated	
2015	x	Top Billboard 200 Album	Nominated	
2016	Ed Sheeran	Top Male Artist	Nominated	
2016	Ed Sheeran	Top Radio Songs Artist	Nominated	
2016	x	Top Billboard 200 Album	Nominated	
2018	Ed Sheeran	Top Artist	Won	
2018	Ed Sheeran	Top Male Artist	Won	
2018	Ed Sheeran	Top Billboard 200 Artist	Nominated	
2018	Ed Sheeran	Top Hot 100 Artist	Won	
2018	Ed Sheeran	Top Song Sales Artist	Won	
2018	Ed Sheeran	Top Radio Songs Artist	Won	
2018	Ed Sheeran	Top Streaming Artist	Nominated	
2018	Ed Sheeran	Top Touring Artist	Nominated	
2018	Ed Sheeran	Billboard Chart Achievement	Nominated	
2018	"Shape of You"	Top Hot 100 Song	Nominated	
2018	"Shape of You"	Top Radio Song	Won	
2018	"Shape of You"	Top Streaming Song (Video)	Nominated	
2018	"Perfect"	Top Selling Song	Nominated	
2018	÷	Top Billboard 200 Album	Nominated	
2018	÷	Top Selling Album	Nominated	
2019	Ed Sheeran	Top Male Artist	Nominated	
2019	Ed Sheeran	Top Touring Artist	Won	
2022	Ed Sheeran	Top Male Artist	Nominated	
2022	Ed Sheeran	Top Billboard Global Artist	Nominated	
2022	Ed Sheeran	Top Billboard Global (Excl. US) Artist	Won	
2022	Ed Sheeran	Top Radio Song Artist	Nominated	
2022	Ed Sheeran	Top Song Sales Artist	Nominated	
2022	"Bad Habits"	Top Selling Song	Nominated	
2022	"Bad Habits"	Top Radio Song	Nominated	
2022	"Bad Habits"	Top Billboard Global (Excl. US) Song	Nominated	
2022	"Bad Habits"	Top Billboard Global Artist Song	Nominated	

== BMI Awards ==
=== BMI Country Awards ===
Year	Nominee / work	Award	Result	Ref.
2020	"Tip of My Tongue" (Note: As a Writer)	Top 50 Songs	Won	

=== BMI London Awards ===
The Broadcast Music, Incorporated (BMI) Awards is an annual award show hosted for the purpose of giving awards to songwriters. Songwriters are selected each year from the entire BMI catalog, based on the number of performances during the award period.

Year	Nominee / work	Award	Result	Ref.
2013	"The A Team"	Pop Award Songs	Won	
2014	"Everything Has Changed" (with Taylor Swift)	Pop Award Songs	Won	
2014	"Lego House"	Pop Award Songs	Won	
2014	"Little Things"	Pop Award Songs	Won	
2016	"Photograph"	Pop Award Songs	Won	
2016	"Thinking Out Loud"	Pop Award Songs	Won	
2016	"Thinking Out Loud"	Song of the Year	Won	
2017	"Thinking Out Loud"	Million Performance Songs	Won	
2017	"Cold Water"	Pop Award Songs	Won	
2017	"Love Yourself"	Pop Award Songs	Won	
2017	"Love Yourself"	Song of the Year	Won	
2018	"Shape of You"	Song of the Year	Won	
2018	"Shape of You"	Million Performance Award	Won	
2018	"Shape of You"	Pop Award Songs	Won	
2018	"Castle on the Hill"	Pop Award Songs	Won	
2018	"Perfect"	Pop Award Songs	Won	
2018	"Strip That Down"	Pop Award Songs	Won	
2019	"Eastside"	Pop Award Songs	Won	
2019	"End Game" (with Taylor Swift and Future)	Pop Award Songs	Won	
2019	"River" (with Eminem)	Pop Award Songs	Won	
2019	"The Rest of Our Life	Pop Award Songs	Won	
2019	"Shape of You"	Million Performance Award	Won	
2020	"2002"	Pop Award Songs	Won	
2020	"Beautiful People" (featuring Khalid)	Pop Award Songs	Won	
2020	"Cross Me" (featuring Chance the Rapper and PnB Rock)	Pop Award Songs	Won	
2020	"I Don't Care" (featuring Justin Bieber)	Pop Award Songs	Won	
2020	"Tip of My Tongue	Pop Award Songs	Won	
2020	"What Am I"	Pop Award Songs	Won	
2020	"Shape of You"	Million Performance Award	Won	
2020	"Perfect"	Million Performance Award	Won	
2020	"Thinking Out Loud"	Million Performance Award	Won	
2021	"Shape of You"	Million Performance Award	Won	
2021	"Love Yourself"	Million Performance Award	Won	
2021	"South of the Border" (featuring Camila Cabello and Cardi B)	Most Performed Songs of the Year	Won	
2021	"Underdog"	Most Performed Songs of the Year	Won	
2022	"Bad Habits"	Song of the Year	Won	
2022	"Afterglow"	Most Performed Songs of the Year	Won	
2022	"Bad Habits"	Most Performed Songs of the Year	Won	
2022	"Shivers"	Most Performed Songs of the Year	Won	
2022	"I Don't Care"	Million-Air Award	Won	
2022	"Perfect"	Million-Air Award	Won	
2023	"2step"	Most Performed Songs of the Year	Won	
2023	"Bam Bam"	Most Performed Songs of the Year	Won	
2023	"Peru"	Most Performed Songs of the Year	Won	
2023	"Shape of You"	Million-Air Award	Won	
2024	"Alone"	Most Performed Songs of the Year	Won	
2024	"Baby Don't Hurt Me"	Most Performed Songs of the Year	Won	
2024	"Eyes Closed"	Most Performed Songs of the Year	Won	
2024	"Thinking Out Loud"	Million-Air Award	Won	

=== BMI Pop Awards ===
Year	Nominee / work	Award	Result	Ref.
2014	"The A Team"	Award Winning Songs	Won	
2015	Ed Sheeran	Songwriter of the Year	Won	
2015	"Everything Has Changed" (with Ed Taylor Swift)	Award Winning Songs	Won	
2015	"Lego House"	Award Winning Songs	Won	
2015	"Sing"	Award Winning Songs	Won	
2016	"Don't"	Award Winning Songs	Won	
2016	"Photograph"	Award Winning Songs	Won	
2016	Thinking Out Loud	Award Winning Songs	Won	
2017	"Cold Water"	Award Winning Songs	Won	
2017	"Love Yourself"	Award Winning Songs	Won	
2018	"Shape of You"	Song of the Year	Won	
2018	"Shape of You"	Award Winning Songs	Won	
2018	"Castle on the Hill"	Award Winning Songs	Won	
2018	"Strip That Down"	Award Winning Songs	Won	
2019	"End Game" (with Taylor Swift and Future)	Award Winning Songs	Won	
2019	"Perfect"	Award Winning Songs	Won	
2020	"Beautiful People" (featuring Khalid)	Most Performed Songs of the Year	Won	
2020	"Eastside"	Most Performed Songs of the Year	Won	
2020	"I Don't Care" (featuring Justin Bieber)	Most Performed Songs of the Year	Won	
2021	"South of the Border" (featuring Camila Cabello and Cardi B)	Most Performed Songs of the Year	Won	
2022	"Afterglow"	Most Performed Songs of the Year	Won	
2022	"Bad Habits"	Most Performed Songs of the Year	Won	
2023	"2step"	Most Performed Songs of the Year	Won	
2023	"Bam Bam" (with Camila Cabello)	Most Performed Songs of the Year	Won	
2023	"Shivers"	Most Performed Songs of the Year	Won	
2024	"Baby Don't Hurt Me"	Most Performed Songs of the Year	Won	
2024	"Eyes Closed"	Most Performed Songs of the Year	Won	

== Brit Awards ==
Year	Nominee / work	Award	Result	Ref.
2012	Ed Sheeran	British Breakthrough Act	Won	
2012	Ed Sheeran	British Male Solo Artist	Won	
2012	+	British Album of the Year	Nominated	
2012	"The A Team"	British Single of the Year	Nominated	
2015	Ed Sheeran	British Male Solo Artist	Won	
2015	×	British Album of the Year	Won	
2015	"Thinking Out Loud"	British Single of the Year	Nominated	
2015	"Thinking Out Loud"	British Video of the Year	Nominated	
2016	"Bloodstream" (with Rudimental)	British Single of the Year	Nominated	
2016	"Photograph"	British Video of the Year	Nominated	
2018	Ed Sheeran	British Male Solo Artist	Nominated	
2018	Ed Sheeran	Global Success Award	Won	
2018	÷	British Album of the Year	Nominated	
2018	"Shape of You"	British Single of the Year	Nominated	
2018	"Shape of You"	British Video of the Year	Nominated	
2019	Ed Sheeran	Global Success Award	Won	
2020	"I Don't Care"	British Single of the Year	Nominated	
2022	Ed Sheeran	British Pop/R&B Act	Nominated	
2022	Ed Sheeran	British Artist of the Year	Nominated	
2022	Ed Sheeran	Songwriter Of The Year	Won	
2022	=	British Album of the Year	Nominated	
2022	"Bad Habits"	British Single of the Year	Nominated	
2023	"Merry Christmas" (with Elton John)	British Single of the Year	Nominated	
2023	"Peru" (with Fireboy DML)	Best International Song	Nominated	
2024	"Eyes Closed"	British Single of the Year	Nominated	

== BT Digital Music Awards ==
Year	Nominee / work	Award	Result	Ref.
2011	Ed Sheeran	Breakthrough Artist of the Year	Nominated	

== Danish Music Awards ==
Year	Nominee / work	Award	Result	Ref.
2017	"Shape of You"	International Hit of the Year	Won	
2017	"÷"	International Album of the Year	Nominated	

== Echo ==
Year	Award	Nomination	Result	Ref
2015	Best International Rock/Pop Male Artist	×	Won	
2016	Best International Rock/Pop Male Artist	×	Won	
2018	Best International Rock/Pop Male Artist	Himself	Won	

== Emmy Awards ==
Year	Nominee/Work	Award	Result	Ref.
2023	"A Beautiful Game" from Ted Lasso (for "So Long, Farewell")	Outstanding Original Music And Lyrics	Won	

== GAFFA Awards ==
=== GAFFA Awards (Denmark) ===
Delivered since 1991. The GAFFA Awards (Danish: GAFFA Prisen) are a Danish award that rewards popular music awarded by the magazine of the same name.

Year	Nominee / work	Award	Result
2014	Ed Sheeran	International Male Artist of the Year	Won
2014	X	International Album of the Year	Won
2018	Ed Sheeran	International Solo Artist of the Year	Won
2018	Divide	International Album of the Year	Won
2018	Castle on the Hill	International Hit of the Year	Nominated
2018	Galway Girl	International Hit of the Year	Nominated
2018	Perfect	International Hit of the Year	Nominated
2018	Shape of You	International Hit of the Year	Won
2019	"River" (ft. Eminem)	International Hit of the Year	Nominated

=== GAFFA Awards (Norway) ===
Delivered since 2012. The GAFFA Awards (Norwegian: GAFFA Prisen) are a Norwegian award that rewards popular music awarded by the magazine of the same name.

Year	Nominee / work	Award	Result
2014	Ed Sheeran	International Solo Artist of the Year	Won
2014	X	International Album of the Year	Won
2014	I See Fire	International Hit of the Year	Won

=== GAFFA Awards (Sweden) ===
Delivered since 2010. The GAFFA Awards (Swedish: GAFFA Priset) are a Swedish award that rewards popular music awarded by the magazine of the same name.

Year	Nominee / work	Award	Result	Ref.
2014	Himself	Best Foreign Solo Act	Won	
2014	X	Best Foreign Album	Won	
2014	"I See Fire"	Best Foreign Song	Won	
2018	"Shape of You"	Best Foreign Song	Nominated	
2019	"River"	Best Foreign Song	Nominated	

== Gaon Chart Music Awards ==
The Gaon Chart Music Awards is an annual awards show in South Korea presented by the national music record chart, Gaon Chart.

Year	Nominee / work	Award	Result
2017	Shape of You	International Song of the Year	Won

== Grammy Awards ==
Year	Nominee / work	Award	Result	Ref.
2013	"The A Team"	Song of the Year	Nominated	
2014	Ed Sheeran	Best New Artist	Nominated	
2014	Red (as featured artist)	Album of the Year	Nominated	
2015	x	Album of the Year	Nominated	
2015	x	Best Pop Vocal Album	Nominated	
2015	"I See Fire"	Best Song Written for Visual Media	Nominated	
2016	"Thinking Out Loud"	Record of the Year	Nominated	
2016	"Thinking Out Loud"	Song of the Year	Won	
2016	"Thinking Out Loud"	Best Pop Solo Performance	Won	
2016	Beauty Behind the Madness (as featured artist)	Album of the Year	Nominated	
2017	"Love Yourself" (as songwriter)	Song of the Year	Nominated	
2018	"Shape of You"	Best Pop Solo Performance	Won	
2018	÷	Best Pop Vocal Album	Won	
2020	No.6 Collaborations Project	Best Pop Vocal Album	Nominated	
2022	"Bad Habits"	Song of the Year	Nominated	
2023	"Bam Bam" (with Camila Cabello)	Best Pop Duo/Group Performance	Nominated	
2024	−	Best Pop Vocal Album	Nominated	

== Goldene Kamera ==
Year	Award	Nomination	Result	Ref
2017	Best International Music	—N/a	Won	

== Global Awards ==
Year	Nominee/work	Nomination	Result	Ref
2018	"Shape of You"	Best Song	Nominated	
2018	"Shape of You"	Most Played Song	Won	
2018	Ed Sheeran	Best Male	Nominated	
2018	Ed Sheeran	Best British Artist or Group	Nominated	
2018	Ed Sheeran	Mass Appeal Award	Nominated	
2022	Ed Sheeran	Best Male	Won	
2022	Ed Sheeran	Best British Act	Won	
2022	Bad Habits	Most Played song	Won	
2023	"Peru" (with Fireboy DML)	Best Song	Nominated	

== Hollywood Music in Media Awards ==
Year	Award	Nomination	Result	Ref
2025	Best Original Song in an Animated Film	"Zoo" (from Zootopia 2)	Nominated	
2025	Best Original Song in a Feature Film	"Drive" (from F1)	Nominated	

== Houston Film Critics Society Awards ==
Year	Award	Nomination	Result	Ref
2013	Best Original Song	"I See Fire"	Nominated	

== IFPI Awards ==
The International Federation of the Phonographic Industry is the organisation that represents the interests of the recording industry worldwide

Year	Award	Nomination	Result	Ref
2017	Album of the Year	÷	Won	
2017	Single of the Year	"Shape of You"	Won	
2017	Global Recording Artist of 2017	Ed Sheeran	Won	

== IHeartRadio Much Music Video Awards ==
Year	Nominee / work	Award	Result	Ref.
2013	"Give Me Love"	International Video of the Year – Artist	Nominated	
2014	"Everything Has Changed" (with Taylor Swift)	International Video of the Year – Artist	Nominated	
2015	Ed Sheeran	Fan Fave International Artist or Group	Nominated	
2015	"Thinking Out Loud"	Most Buzzworthy International Artist or Group	Won	
2015	"Thinking Out Loud"	Best International Artist	Won	
2017	Ed Sheeran	International Artist of the Year	Nominated	
2017	Ed Sheeran	Most Buzzworthy International Artist or Group	Won	
2017	Ed Sheeran	Fan Fave International Artist or Group	Nominated	
2018	Ed Sheeran	International Best Pop Artist or Group	Nominated	
2018	Ed Sheeran	Artist of the Year	Nominated	
2018	Ed Sheeran	Fan Fave Artist	Nominated	
2018	"Perfect"	Fan Fave Single	Nominated	

== IHeartRadio Music Awards ==
Year	Nominee / work	Award	Result	Ref.
2015	"Thinking Out Loud"	Best Lyrics	Nominated	
2015	Sheerios	Best Fan Army	Nominated	
2016	Ed Sheeran	Male Artist of the Year	Nominated	
2016	"Photograph"	Best Lyrics	Nominated	
2016	×	Album of the Year	Nominated	
2016	"Trap Queen" (cover)	Best Cover Song	Nominated	
2018	Ed Sheeran	Male Artist of the Year	Won	
2018	"Shape of You"	Song of the Year	Won	
2018	"Shape of You"	Best Music Video	Nominated	
2018	"Shape of You"	Most Thumbed Up Song of the Year	Won	
2018	"Perfect"	Best Lyrics	Nominated	
2018	"Touch"	Best Cover Song	Nominated	
2018	÷	Pop Album of the Year	Won	
2019	"Perfect"	Song of the Year	Nominated	
2019	Ed Sheeran	Male Artist of the Year	Nominated	
2020	Ed Sheeran	Male Artist of the Year	Nominated	
2020	"I Don't Care" (with Justin Bieber)	Best Collaboration	Nominated	
2020	"I Don't Care" (with Justin Bieber)	Best Music Video	Nominated	
2020	"Beautiful People" (with Khalid)	Best Lyrics	Nominated	
2020	Zakary Walters – Ed Sheeran	Favorite Tour Photographer	Nominated	
2022	Ed Sheeran	Male Artist of the Year	Nominated	
2022	"Bad Habits"	Song of the Year	Nominated	
2022	"Bad Habits"	Best Lyrics	Nominated	
2022	"Bad Habits"	Best Music Video	Nominated	
2026	"Camera"	Best Lyrics	Nominated	
2026	"Sapphire"	Best Music Video	Nominated	
2026	One Shot with Ed Sheeran: A Musical Experience	Favorite On Screen	Nominated	

== IHeartRadio Titanium Awards ==
iHeartRadio Titanium Awards are awarded to an artist when their song reaches 1 Billion Spins across iHeartRadio Stations.

Year	Nominee/Work		Result	Ref
2017	"Shape of You"	1 Billion Total Audience Spins on iHeartRadio Stations	Won	
2018	"Perfect"	1 Billion Total Audience Spins on iHeartRadio Stations	Won	
2020	"I Don't Care" (with Justin Bieber)	1 Billion Total Audience Spins on iHeartRadio Stations	Won	
2022	"Bad Habits"	1 Billion Total Audience Spins on iHeartRadio Stations	Won	
2023	"Shivers"	1 Billion Total Audience Spins on iHeartRadio Stations	Won	

== Ivor Novello Awards ==
Year	Award	Nomination	Result	Ref
2012	Best Song Musically and Lyrically	"The A Team"	Won	
2015	Songwriter of the Year	Ed Sheeran	Won	
2016	Best Song Musically and Lyrically	"Bloodstream"	Nominated	
2018	Most Performed Work	Shape of You	Won	
2018	Most Performed Work	Castle on the Hill	Nominated	
2018	Songwriter of the Year	Ed Sheeran	Won	
2022	Most Performed Work	"Bad Habits"	Won	
2022	Most Performed Work	"Shivers"	Nominated	
2022	Songwriter of the Year	Ed Sheeran	Nominated	
2023	Most Performed Work	"Bad Habits"	Nominated	
2023	Most Performed Work	"Shivers"	Nominated	

== JIM Awards ==
Year	Nominee / work	Award	Result	Ref.
2013	Ed Sheeran	Best Male – International	Nominated	
2014	Ed Sheeran	Best Male – International	Nominated	
2015	Ed Sheeran	Best Male – International	Won	
2015	Ed Sheeran	Best Pop	Won	
2015	Ed Sheeran	Best Live Act	Nominated	
2015	x	Best Album	Won	

== Joox Thailand Music Awards ==
Year	Nominee / work	Award	Result	Ref.
2017	Ed Sheeran	International Artist of the Year	Nominated	
2018	Ed Sheeran	International Artist of the Year	Won	

== Juno Awards ==
Year	Nominee / work	Award	Result	Ref.
2018	÷	International Album of the Year	Nominated	
2020	No.6 Collaborations Project	International Album of the Year	Nominated	
2023	=	International Album of the Year	Nominated	

== London International Award ==
Year	Award	Nomination	Result	Ref
2022	Best Visual Effects	2step ft Lil Baby	Silver	

== LOS40 Music Awards ==
Year	Nominee / work	Award	Result
2014	x	Best International Album	Won
2015	"Thinking Out Loud"	Best International Song	Nominated
2015	Ed Sheeran	Best International Act	Nominated
2017	Ed Sheeran	International Artist of the Year	Won
2017	÷	International Album of the Year	Won
2017	"Shape of You"	International Song of the Year	Nominated
2017	"Shape of You"	International Video of the Year	Nominated
2017	÷ Tour	Tour of the Year	Nominated
2018	Ed Sheeran	International Artist of the Year	Nominated
2018	"Perfect" (with Beyoncé)	International Song of the Year	Nominated
2019	Ed Sheeran	International Artist of the Year	Nominated
2019	No. 6 Collaborations Project	International Album of the Year	Nominated
2019	"I Don't Care" (with Justin Bieber)	International Song of the Year	Nominated
2021	Ed Sheeran	International Artist of the Year	Won
2021	Ed Sheeran	International Live Artist of the Year	Won
2021	"Bad Habits"	International Song of the Year	Won
2021	"Bad Habits"	International Video of the Year	Won
2022	=	Best International Album	Nominated
2022	"Bam Bam" (with Camila Cabello)	Best International Song	Nominated
2022	"Bam Bam" (with Camila Cabello)	Best International Collaboration	Nominated

== Lunas del Auditorio ==
Year	Nominee / work	Award	Result	Ref.
2017	Ed Sheeran	Pop in Foreign Language	Won	

== Melon Music Awards ==
Year	Nominee/Work	Award	Result	Ref.
2017	Shape of You	Best Pop Song	Won	

== Mercury Prize ==
Year	Nominee/Work	Award	Result	Ref.
2017	÷	Album of The Year	Shortlisted	

== Mnet Asian Music Awards ==
Year	Nominee/Work	Award	Result	Ref.
2021	Ed Sheeran	Favorite International Artist	Won	

== MOBO Awards ==
Year	Award	Nomination	Result	Ref
2011	Best Newcomer	Ed Sheeran	Nominated	
2012	Best Male Act	Ed Sheeran	Nominated	
2012	Best Album	+	Nominated	
2012	Best Song	"Lego House"	Nominated	
2014	Best Song	"Sing"	Nominated	

== MTV Awards ==
=== MTV Europe Music Awards ===
Year	Award	Nomination	Result	Ref
2012	Best UK & Ireland Act	Ed Sheeran	Nominated	
2014	Best UK & Ireland Act	Ed Sheeran	Nominated	
2014	Best Male	Ed Sheeran	Nominated	
2015	Best Male	Ed Sheeran	Nominated	
2015	Best Live Act	Ed Sheeran	Won	
2015	Best World Stage Performance	Ed Sheeran	Won	
2015	Best UK & Ireland Act	Ed Sheeran	Nominated	
2017	Best Artist	Ed Sheeran	Nominated	
2017	Best Live	Ed Sheeran	Won	
2017	Best UK & Ireland Act	Ed Sheeran	Nominated	
2017	Best Song	"Shape of You"	Nominated	
2018	Best Live	Ed Sheeran	Nominated	
2021	Best Song	"Bad Habits"	Won	
2021	Best Video	"Bad Habits"	Nominated	
2021	Best Artist	Ed Sheeran	Won	
2021	Best UK & Ireland Act	Ed Sheeran	Nominated	
2022	Video For Good	"2step"	Nominated	
2022	Best Pop	Ed Sheeran	Nominated	
2022	Best Live Act	Ed Sheeran	Nominated	

=== MTV Italian Music Awards ===
Year	Award	Nomination	Result	Ref
2015	Artist Saga	Ed Sheeran	Nominated	
2015	Superman	Ed Sheeran	Nominated	
2015	Best Tormentone	"Thinking Out Loud"	Nominated	
2016	Best International Male	Ed Sheeran	Nominated	
2016	Artist Saga	Ed Sheeran	Nominated	
2016	#MTVAwardsStar	Ed Sheeran	Nominated	
2017	Best International Male	Ed Sheeran	Nominated	
2017	Artist Saga	Ed Sheeran	Nominated	
2017	#MTVAwardsStar	Ed Sheeran	Nominated	

=== MTV Video Music Awards ===
Year	Nominee / work	Award	Result	Ref.
2013	"Lego House"	Best Male Video	Nominated	
2014	"Sing" (featuring Pharrell Williams)	Best Male Video	Won	
2015	"Thinking Out Loud"	Video of the Year	Nominated	
2015	"Thinking Out Loud"	Best Male Video	Nominated	
2015	"Thinking Out Loud"	Best Pop Video	Nominated	
2015	"Thinking Out Loud"	Best Cinematography	Nominated	
2015	"Don't"	Best Choreography	Nominated	
2015	"Don't"	Best Editing	Nominated	
2017	Ed Sheeran	Artist of the Year	Won	
2017	"Shape of You"	Best Pop	Nominated	
2017	"Castle on the Hill"	Best Cinematography	Nominated	
2018	"Perfect"	Song of the Year	Nominated	
2018	"Perfect"	Best Pop	Nominated	
2018	"Perfect"	Best Direction	Nominated	
2018	"River" (with Eminem)	Best Cinematography	Nominated	
2019	"I Don't Care" (with Justin Bieber)	Best Collaboration	Nominated	
2019	"I Don't Care" (with Justin Bieber)	Song of Summer	Nominated	
2020	"Beautiful People" (featuring Khalid)	Best Collaboration	Nominated	
2021	"Bad Habits"	Video of the Year	Nominated	
2021	"Bad Habits"	Best Choreography	Nominated	
2021	"Bad Habits"	Best Art Direction	Nominated	
2021	"Bad Habits"	Song of Summer	Nominated	
2022	"Shivers"	Video of the Year	Nominated	
2022	"Shivers"	Best Pop Video	Nominated	
2022	"Shivers"	Best Direction	Nominated	
2022	Ed Sheeran	Artist of the Year	Nominated	
2022	"Bam Bam" (with Camila Cabello)	Best Cinematography	Nominated	
2023	"Eyes Closed"	Best Cinematography	Nominated	
2023	"Eyes Closed"	Best Pop Video	Nominated	
2023	Ed Sheeran	Show Of The Summer	Nominated	

=== MTV Video Music Awards Japan ===
Year	Nominee / work	Award	Result	Ref.
2017	"Shape of You"	Best Pop International Video	Won	

=== MTV Millennial Awards ===
Year	Nominee / work	Award	Result	Ref.
2018	"River" (ft. Eminem)	Collaboration of the Year	Nominated	
2018	"Perfect"	International Hit of the Year	Nominated	
2018	Ed Sheeran	Global Instagrammer	Nominated	

=== MTV Millennial Awards Brazil ===
Year	Nominee / work	Award	Result	Ref.
2021	"Bad Habits"	Global Hit	Nominated	

== Myx Music Awards ==
Year	Nominee / work	Award	Result	Ref.
2018	"Perfect"	International Video of the Year	Nominated	

== Nickelodeon Kids' Choice Awards ==
=== Nickelodeon Kids' Choice Awards ===
Year	Nominee / work	Award	Result	Ref.
2016	Ed Sheeran	Favorite Male Singer	Nominated	
2016	"Thinking Out Loud"	Favorite Song	Nominated	
2018	"Shape of You"	Favorite Song	Won	
2018	Ed Sheeran	Favorite Male Singer	Nominated	
2020	Ed Sheeran	Favorite Male Singer	Nominated	
2020	"I Don't Care" (with Justin Bieber)	Favorite Music Collaboration	Nominated	
2023	"Bam Bam" (with Camila Cabello)	Favorite Music Collaboration	Nominated	
2023	Ed Sheeran	Favorite Male Singer	Nominated	

=== Nickelodeon UK Kids' Choice Awards ===
Year	Award	Nomination	Result	Ref
2012	Favorite UK Male Artist	Ed Sheeran	Nominated	
2013	Favorite UK Male Artist	Ed Sheeran	Won	
2015	UK Favourite Music Act	Ed Sheeran	Nominated	

=== Meus Prêmios Nick ===
The Meus Prêmios Nick is an annual awards show that awards entertainers with a blimp trophy, as voted by kids on internet.

Year	Nominee / work	Award	Result	Ref.
2015	Ed Sheeran	Favorite International Artist	Nominated	

== NME Awards ==
Year	Award	Nomination	Result	Ref
2013	BEST Band	Ed Sheeran	Nominated	
2016	Best British Solo Artist	Ed Sheeran	Nominated	

== NRJ Music Awards ==
Year	Award	Nomination	Result	Ref
2014	International Male Artist of the Year	Ed Sheeran	Nominated	
2015	International Male Artist of the Year	Ed Sheeran	Won	
2017	International Male Artist of the Year	Ed Sheeran	Won	
2017	Honor Award	Ed Sheeran	Won	
2017	International Video of the Year	Shape of You	Won	
2017	International Song of the Year	Shape of You	Nominated	
2018	International Male Artist of the Year	Ed Sheeran	Won	
2019	International Male Artist of the Year	Ed Sheeran	Won	
2021	International Male Artist of the Year	Ed Sheeran	Won	
2021	International Song of the Year	Bad Habits	Won	
2021	Video of the Year	Bad Habits	Nominated	
2022	International Male Artist of the Year	Ed Sheeran	Won	
2022	International Song of the Year	Bam Bam (with Camila Cabello )	Nominated	
2022	International Collaborations	Bam Bam (with Camila Cabello )	Won	
2022	International Collaborations	Peru (with Fireboy DML )	Nominated	
2023	International Male Artist of the Year	Ed Sheeran	Won	

== People's Choice Awards ==
Year	Nominee / work	Award	Result	Ref.
2015	×	Favorite Album	Won	
2015	Ed Sheeran	Favorite Male Artist	Won	
2016	Ed Sheeran	Favorite Male Artist	Won	
2016	Ed Sheeran	Favorite Pop Artist	Nominated	
2018	Ed Sheeran	Male Artist of the Year	Nominated	
2019	Ed Sheeran	Male Artist of the Year	Nominated	
2019	"I Don't Care"	Song of the Year	Nominated	
2019	No.6 Collaborations Project	Album of the Year	Nominated	
2022	Mathematics Tour	Concert Tour of the Year	Nominated	
2022	"Bam Bam" (with Camila Cabello)	Collaboration of the Year	Nominated	

== Pollstar Awards ==
The Pollstar Awards is an annual award ceremony to honor artists and professionals in the concert industry held by "Pollstar".

Year	Award	Nomination	Result	Ref
2012	Best New Touring Artist	Ed Sheeran	Nominated	

== The Pop Hub Awards ==
The Pop Hub Awards is an annual internet fan-voted award show in Poland.

Year	Award	Nomination	Result	Ref
2022	International Male Artist	Ed Sheeran	Nominated	
2022	International Album of The Year	=	Nominated	
2022	International Video of The Year	"Shivers"	Nominated	

== Premios 40 Principales ==
Year	Award	Nomination	Result	Ref
2014	Best International Album	×	Won	
2015	Best International Artist	Ed Sheeran	Nominated	
2015	Best International Song	"Thinking Out Loud"	Nominated	
2017	Best International Artist	Ed Sheeran	Won	
2017	Best International Album	"÷" (Divide)	Won	
2017	Best International Song	"Shape of You"	Nominated	
2017	Best International Video	"Shape of You"	Nominated	
2017	Tour of the Year	"Divide World Tour"	Nominated	

== Premios Juventud ==
Year	Award	Nomination	Result	Ref
2015	Favorite Hit	"Thinking Out Loud"	Nominated	

== Premios Musa ==
The Musa Awards are a Chilean music award, delivered by the radio conglomerate Ibero Americana Radio Chile and its ten national radio stations

Year	Award	Nomination	Result	Ref
2021	International Song of The Year	"Bad Habits"	Nominated	
2022	International Collaboration of The Year	"Sigue" (with J Balvin)	Nominated	

== Premios Odeón ==
Year	Award	Nomination	Result	Ref
2022	International Odeón Artist	Ed Sheeran	Nominated	
2022	Best International Song	"Bad Habits"	Nominated	
2022	Best International Album	=	Nominated	

== Primetime Emmy Award ==
Year	Award	Nomination	Result	Ref
2023	Outstanding Original Music and Lyrics	"A Beautiful Game" (from Ted Lasso)	Won	

== Q Awards ==
Year	Award	Nomination	Result	Ref
2011	Breakthrough Artist	Ed Sheeran	Won	
2011	Best Male Artist	Ed Sheeran	Nominated	
2011	Best Single	"You Need Me, I Don't Need You"	Nominated	
2014	Best Solo Artist	Ed Sheeran	Won	
2015	Best Solo Artist	Ed Sheeran	Won	
2015	Best Live Act	Ed Sheeran	Nominated	
2017	Best Act in the World	Ed Sheeran	Won	
2017	Best Solo Artist	Ed Sheeran	Nominated	
2017	Best Track	"Shape of You"	Nominated	

== Radio Disney Music Awards ==
Year	Nominee / work	Award	Result	Ref.
2014	"Everything Has Changed" (with Taylor Swift)	Best Musical Collaboration	Won	
2015	Ed Sheeran	Best Male Artist	Won	
2016	Ed Sheeran	Best Male Artist	Won	
2018	Ed Sheeran	Best Artist	Nominated	
2018	"Perfect"	Best Crush Song	Won	

== RTHK International Pop Poll Awards ==
Year	Nominee / work	Award	Result	Ref.
2022	Ed Sheeran	International Male Artist	Won	
2022	Top 10 International Songs	"Merry Christmas" (with Elton John)	Nominated	
2022	Top 10 International Songs	"Bam Bam" (with Camila Cabello)	Nominated	
2022	Top 10 International Songs	"2step" (feat. Armaan Malik)	Nominated	
2022	Top 10 International Songs	"Bad Habits"	Won	
2022	Top 10 International Songs	"Shivers"	Nominated	
2022	Top 10 International Songs	"Visiting Hours"	Nominated	

== Satellite Awards ==
Year	Nominee / work	Award	Result
2014	"I See Fire"	Best Original Song	Nominated

== Silver Clef Award ==
Year	Award	Nomination	Result	Ref
2019	O2 Silver Clef Award	Ed Sheeran	Won	

== Swiss Music Awards ==
Year	Nominee / work	Award	Result	Ref.
2015	Ed Sheeran	Best Act International	Won	
2015	"I See Fire"	Best Hit International	Nominated	
2018	Ed Sheeran	Best Act International	Won	
2018	"Shape of You"	Best Hit International	Won	
2022	Ed Sheeran	Best International Solo Act	Won	

== Teen Choice Awards ==
Year	Nominee / work	Award	Result	Ref.
2013	Choice Breakout Artist	Ed Sheeran	Won	
2014	Choice Male Artist	Ed Sheeran	Won	
2014	Choice Song: Male Artist	"Sing" (featuring Pharrell Williams)	Won	
2015	Choice Male Artist	Ed Sheeran	Won	
2015	Choice Summer Music Star Male	Ed Sheeran	Won	
2015	Choice Song: Male Artist	"Thinking Out Loud"	Won	
2015	Choice Love Song	"Thinking Out Loud"	Nominated	
2015	Choice Break-Up Song	"Don't"	Nominated	
2015	Choice Summer Tour	x Tour	Nominated	
2017	Choice Male Artist	Ed Sheeran	Nominated	
2017	Choice Song: Male Artist	"Shape of You"	Nominated	
2017	Choice Pop Song	"Shape of You"	Won	
2018	Choice Male Artist	Ed Sheeran	Nominated	
2018	Choice Song: Male Artist	"Perfect"	Won	
2018	Choice Collaboration	"End Game" (featuring Taylor Swift and Future)	Nominated	

== Telehit Awards ==
Year	Award	Nomination	Result	Ref
2014	Best Male Pop Album	×	Won	
2017	Song of the Year	"Shape of You"	Nominated	
2017	Video of the Year	"Shape of You"	Won	
2017	Male Soloist of the Year	Ed Sheeran	Nominated	

== TEC Awards ==
Year	Award	Nomination	Result	Ref
2018	Outstanding Creative Achievement – Record Production/Album	÷	Nominated	
2018	Outstanding Creative Achievement – Record Production/Single or Track	Shape of You	Nominated	

== UK Music Video Awards ==
Year	Nominee / work	Award	Result	Ref.
2011	"You Need Me, I Don't Need You"	Best Urban Video – UK	Nominated	
2011	"You Need Me, I Don't Need You"	Best Editing in a Video	Nominated	
2014	"Don't"	Best Choreography in a Video	Nominated	
2015	Ed Sheeran	Best Artist	Nominated	
2015	"Thinking Out Loud"	Best Choreography in a Video	Nominated	
2016	Jumpers For Goalposts: Live at Wembley Stadium	Best Live Music Coverage	Nominated	
2017	"Castle on the Hill"	Best Pop Video – UK	Nominated	
2017	"Castle on the Hill"	Best Cinematography in a Video	Nominated	
2019	"Cross Me" (with Chance the Rapper & PnB Rock)	Best Pop Video – UK	Nominated	
2019	"Antisocial" (with Travis Scott)	Best Pop Video – UK	Nominated	
2021	"Bad Habits"	Best Visual Effects in a Video	Nominated	

== Urban Music Awards ==
Year	Award	Nomination	Result	Ref
2011	Best Male Artist	Ed Sheeran	Won	
2011	Artist Of The Year	Ed Sheeran	Nominated	
2012	Best Collaboration	"Watchtower" (with Devlin)	Won	
2014	Best Crossover Pop Act 2014	Ed Sheeran	Nominated	
2014	Best Music Video 2014	"Sing" (ft Pharrell Williams)	Nominated	
2014	Best Album 2014	×	Nominated	
2015	Best Male Act	Ed Sheeran	Nominated	
2015	Best Album 2015	×	Nominated	
2023	Collaboration of the Year	"Peru" (with Fireboy DML)	Won	

== World Music Awards ==
Year	Nominee / work	Award	Result	Ref.
2014	Ed Sheeran	World's Best Male Artist	Nominated	
2014	Ed Sheeran	World's Best Live Act	Nominated	
2014	Ed Sheeran	World's Best Entertainer	Nominated	
2014	Ed Sheeran	World's Best British Solo Acted (Voted)	Won	
2014	Ed Sheeran	World's Best British Entertainer (Voted)	Won	

== Young Hollywood Awards ==
Year	Nominee / work	Award	Result	Ref.
2014	Ed Sheeran	Hottest Music Artist	Won	

== Other accolades ==
=== Honorary degree ===
Name of school, year given, and name of degree
School	Year	Degree	Ref.
University of Suffolk	2015	Honorary Doctorate of Music	
