= Small Bump =

2012 single by Ed Sheeran

Single by Ed Sheeran

from the album +
- Released: 25 May 2012
- Genre: Folk
- Length: 4:19
- Label: Warner
- Songwriter: Ed Sheeran
- Producer: Jake Gosling

Ed Sheeran singles chronology
| "Drunk" (2012) | "Small Bump" (2012) | "Hush Little Baby" (2012) |

Music video
- "Small Bump" on YouTube

"Small Bump" is a song by English singer-songwriter Ed Sheeran, released as the fifth single from his debut studio album, +. The song was written by Sheeran and produced by Jake Gosling. The single peaked at number 25 on the UK Singles Chart. The song was released to radio as the sixth and final single in Australia, where "Give Me Love" was released as the fifth single.

== Background ==
On 26 March 2012, Sheeran announced on Twitter that "Small Bump" would be released as the fifth single from his debut album + saying "Before it gets out there, I'd like to be the first one to announce what the fifth single taken from my album '+' is." He added: "So the single is.... Small Bump." The song is written in the key of B-flat major. The song is about Sheeran's "close friend" and laments a stillbirth five months into the pregnancy. It is sung from a first-person perspective. A remix by Asa & Stumbleine was due to feature on the EP but was never finished.

== Irish abortion referendum ==
In the run-up to the 2018 Irish Abortion referendum, a campaign against abortion rights, used "Small Bump" without Sheeran's permission. On 19 May 2018, he wrote on Instagram: "I've been informed that my song "Small Bump" is being used to promote the anti-abortion campaign, and I feel it's important to let you know I have not given approval for this use, and it does not reflect what the song is about."

== Track listing ==
Digital download – EP
| No. | Title | Length |
|---|---|---|
| 1. | "Small Bump" | 4:19 |
| 2. | "Small Bump" (Live uStream Version) | 6:52 |
| 3. | "Small Bump" (SBTV A64 Version) | 3:34 |
| 4. | "Small Bump" (Instrumental) | 4:19 |
| 5. | "Small Bump" (Acoustic) | 3:54 |

Promotional CD single
| No. | Title | Length |
|---|---|---|
| 1. | "Small Bump" | 4:19 |

== Charts ==
=== Weekly charts ===
| Chart (2012–13) | Peak position |
|---|---|
| Australia (ARIA) | 14 |
| Ireland (IRMA) | 17 |
| New Zealand (Recorded Music NZ) | 11 |
| Scotland Singles (OCC) | 21 |
| UK Singles (OCC) | 25 |

=== Year-end charts ===
| Chart (2012) | Position |
|---|---|
| UK Singles (OCC) | 142 |

== Certifications ==
| Region | Certification | Certified units/sales |
|---|---|---|
| Australia (ARIA) | Platinum | 70,000^{^} |
| Canada (Music Canada) | Platinum | 80,000^{‡} |
| New Zealand (RMNZ) | Platinum | 15,000^{*} |
| United Kingdom (BPI) | Platinum | 600,000^{‡} |
| United States (RIAA) | Gold | 500,000^{‡} |
Streaming
| Denmark (IFPI Danmark) | Gold | 1,300,000^{†} |
^{*} Sales figures based on certification alone.^{^} Shipments figures based on certification alone.^{‡} Sales+streaming figures based on certification alone.^{†} Streaming-only figures based on certification alone.
