= We Can't Dance (disambiguation) =

We Can't Dance is a 1991 album by Genesis.

We Can't Dance may also refer to:

- We Can't Dance Tour, 1992
- We Can't Dance (band), English indie rock band active 2009 to 2013
