= Drunk (Ed Sheeran song) =

Single by Ed Sheeran

from the album +
- Released: 17 February 2012
- Recorded: 2011
- Length: 3:20
- Label: Warner
- Songwriters: Ed Sheeran; Jake Gosling
- Producer: Jake Gosling

Ed Sheeran singles chronology
"Lego House" (2011)	"Drunk" (2012)	"Small Bump" (2012)

Music video
- "Drunk" on YouTube

"Drunk" is a song by English singer-songwriter Ed Sheeran. It was released as the fourth single lifted from the debut studio album + on 17 February 2012. The song was written by Ed Sheeran and Jake Gosling and produced by Gosling. The single entered the UK Singles Chart at number 63. The week after, it climbed to number 29. Later on, it climbed to number 9, making it his fourth top ten single.

== Background ==
On 14 January 2012, Ed Sheeran announced on Twitter that his single, "Drunk" would be released as the fourth single from his debut album + saying "So my next single is Drunk, I got 2 music videos coming for you..... :)". The official music video, released on 23 January 2012 features a cat who takes Ed out and gets him drunk to distract him from a break-up. The girl in the video is Nina Nesbitt. This happens to be his first music video that he fully starred in. Another video was released several days before made by his cousin. The music video featured a mash up of clips from his UK tour.

== Live performances ==
Sheeran performed the song live for The Graham Norton Show on 27 January 2012. He performed the single live on 25 February 2012 on Let's Dance for Sport Relief.

== Music video ==
A music video was released for the song on 20 January 2012 with Nina Nesbitt and currently has over 100 million views on YouTube. The video, written and directed by Saman Kesh, starts with Sheeran coming home and sitting down on the couch, depressed. As he opens a can of beer, he notices his cat talking to him. Together they drink beer and do various activities, and later they go to a pub. Sheeran and his cat are kicked out when a person takes a photo of Sheeran and his cat starts a fight with that person. They bring several women and cats home to party and Sheeran starts hallucinating from his intoxication. The video ends with Sheeran waking up on the same couch with his cat next to him and a can of beer on the table. Throughout the video, Sheeran continues to have flashbacks of a particular woman and looks depressed immediately after, implying that she is Sheeran's ex-girlfriend who recently broke up with him.

== Track listing ==
Digital download
No.	Title	Length
1.	"Drunk" (Rudimental Remix)	4:42
2.	"Drunk" (Doctor P Remix)	3:46
3.	"Drunk" (Lazy Jay's Wasted In London Remix)	5:18
4.	"Drunk" (Lazy Jay's Rave-O-Lution Remix)	5:00
5.	"Drunk" (Jayglo Remix)	4:31

CD single
No.	Title	Length
1.	"Drunk"	3:20
2.	"Drunk" (Rudimental Remix)	3:46
3.	"Drunk" (Doctor P Remix)	5:18
4.	"Drunk" (Lazy Jay's Wasted In London Remix)	5:00
5.	"Drunk" (Lazy Jay's Rave-o-Lution Dub)	4:42

7" vinyl
No.	Title	Length
1.	"Drunk"	3:20
2.	"Drunk" (Rudimental Remix)	4:42

== Credits and personnel ==
- Lead vocals – Ed Sheeran
- Producers – Jake Gosling
- Lyrics – Ed Sheeran, Jake Gosling
- Label – Warner Music Group

== Charts ==
=== Weekly charts ===
Chart (2012–13)	Peak position
Australia (ARIA)	9
Belgium (Ultratip Bubbling Under Flanders)	22
Euro Digital Song Sales (Billboard)	12
Ireland (IRMA)	7
Japan Hot 100 (Billboard)	56
New Zealand (Recorded Music NZ)	23
Scottish Singles Sales (Official Charts)	10
Slovakia Airplay (ČNS IFPI)	43
UK Singles (Official Charts)	9
US Hot Rock & Alternative Songs (Billboard)	26

=== Year-end charts ===
Chart (2012)	Position
UK Singles (Official Charts Company)	71
Chart (2013)	Position
US Hot Rock Songs (Billboard)	99

== Certifications ==
Region	Certification	Certified units/sales
Australia (ARIA)	2× Platinum	140,000^{^}
Canada (Music Canada)	Platinum	80,000^{‡}
New Zealand (RMNZ)	Platinum	15,000^{*}
United Kingdom (BPI)	Platinum	600,000^{‡}
United States (RIAA)	Gold	500,000^{‡}
Streaming
Denmark (IFPI Danmark)	Gold	900,000^{†}
^{*} Sales figures based on certification alone.^{^} Shipments figures based on certification alone.^{‡} Sales+streaming figures based on certification alone.^{†} Streaming-only figures based on certification alone.

== Release history ==
Region	Date	Format	Label
United Kingdom	17 February 2012	Digital download	Warner
Italy	29 June 2012	Airplay	Warner
