= The A Team (Ed Sheeran song) =

2011 single by Ed Sheeran

Single by Ed Sheeran

from the album +
- Released: 10 June 2011
- Genre: Folk
- Length: 4:18 (album version); 3:42 (radio edit)
- Label: Lava; Atlantic
- Songwriter: Ed Sheeran
- Producer: Jake Gosling

Ed Sheeran singles chronology
"If I Could" (2011)	"The A Team" (2011)	"Young Guns" (2011)

Music video
- "The A Team" on YouTube

"The A Team" is the debut solo single by English singer Ed Sheeran. It was released as a digital download in the United Kingdom on 10 June 2011, serving as the lead single from his debut album, + (2011). "The A Team" is a folk ballad about a homeless woman addicted to crack cocaine, a Class A drug. It was written after Sheeran visited a homeless shelter and heard some of the stories of the lives people had been living. He wrote the song following a last-minute performance at an event for the homeless. The chorus of "The A Team" was also used by Sheeran in the track "Little Lady", which features Mikill Pane. "Little Lady" is available on the EP No. 5 Collaborations Project.

It became a top 10 hit in Australia, Germany, Ireland, Israel, Japan, Luxembourg, New Zealand, Norway, the Netherlands, and the United Kingdom. It debuted at number three on the UK Singles Chart, with sales of 57,607 copies. The song was serviced to US radio formats in late 2012 and became a sleeper hit there, gradually rising up the Billboard Hot 100 to peak at number 16, becoming Sheeran's first single on that chart. On 5 December, the song received a Grammy Award nomination for Song of the Year, Sheeran's first Grammy Award nomination. At the 2012 Brit Awards, it was nominated for Best British Single.

== Background and release ==
Sheeran said the song came from "an experience I had when I did a gig at a homeless shelter". He explained, "I was 18 at the time and kind of quite naive. So, I was a bit taken aback by some of the stories that I heard. [...] I wanted to write it so it sounded kind of upbeat, so you wouldn't really know what it's about, because it's quite a dark subject." In a 2011 video interview with Absolute Radio, Sheeran stated that it was based on the experiences of a particular woman at the shelter, named Angel, hence the 'Angels to fly' line in the song. Talking to Billboard, he explained the title: "A drug like crack cocaine is called a 'Class A drug'. That's in the same category as heroin. Instead of making it clear and just saying what the problem was, I'd say, 'She's in the 'Class A' team.'" The single was released 1 May 2011, in the UK through Atlantic Records. In US, "The A Team" was serviced to adult album alternative (also triple-A, AAA, or adult alternative) stations on 27 February 2012.

== Composition ==
According to the sheet music published by EMI Music Publishing, "The A Team" is set in common time with a tempo of 170 beats per minute. Written in the key of A major; Sheeran's vocals range from the note of A_{2} to A_{4}. Instrumentation is provided by guitar, piano and vocals. "The A Team" is a folk song. Gary Trust from Billboard compared the song to "folk/rock hits like Suzanne Vega's 'Luka' (about child abuse), 10,000 Maniacs' 'Like the Weather' (depression) and Tracy Chapman's 'Fast Car' (alcoholism)", songs that "shade their heavy topics under a melodic canopy". Ryan Reed from the publication, considered it as a jazz-folk song.

== Critical reception ==
"The A Team" received critical acclaim. TheMark Moore of Contactmusic.com awarded the single 7/10, calling it a "beautiful melodic track that is made by its dark lyrical content..." Critics also praised Sheeran's vocals. Robert Copsey of Digital Spy awarded the song 5 stars out of 5, writing that Sheeran's "man-and-his-guitar concept is about as cliché as they come, but it's his intelligent lyrics and softer than cream cheese vocals that set him apart from the pack." He further praised the song, commenting that "Sheeran's frank honesty and lump-in-the-throat-like emotion are weighted by a folky melody and off-kilter acoustics."

== Chart performance ==
The track made its debut on the UK Singles Chart at number three on 19 June 2011 – entering as the second highest new entry behind Calvin Harris and Kelis' "Bounce", which debuted at number two and then it spent four non-consecutive weeks at the number three position. "The A Team" also saw chart success elsewhere, peaking at number two on the Scottish Singles. "The A Team" became the best selling debut single and the overall eighth best-selling single of 2011 in the UK, shifting 801,000 copies. As of September 2017, the song has sold 1,119,000 copies, with 46 million streams, making a total of 1,587,000 combined units.

The single debuted on the Australian Singles Chart at number thirty-two, 23 October 2011. It peaked at number two for two weeks and has been certified 10-times platinum by the Australian Recording Industry Association (ARIA) for sales and streams of 700,000 units. On the New Zealand Singles Chart the song entered at number thirty-eight, 21 November 2011. It peaked at number three and has been certified platinum by Recording Industry Association of New Zealand (RIANZ) for sales of 15,000 copies. The song also peaked at number three and Irish Singles Chart.

After being serviced to radio formats in US, the song made its first American chart entry on Billboard's component Adult Pop Songs at number thirty-eight. It also debuted at number 95 on the Billboard Hot 100 and has since peaked at number 16, becoming Sheeran's first top 20 hit on the chart. It also peaked at 29 on the Canadian Hot 100. As of February 2015, "The A Team" has sold 2.3 million copies in the United States.

== Music video ==
The music video for the song was shot and edited by Ruskin Kyle (Rivers Rush Video Production Company). Sheeran refers to when he first created the demo for the song during an interview with 96.1 KISS, "Whenever I wrote songs in the past, I never recorded them down because I didn't have a recorder but I had a Mac computer and made a video version of it." The original demos for "The A Team" were originally all recorded in this manner but not released to the public. When asked about his inspiration behind the Grammy nominated hit, Sheeran shared, "The A Team is written about a woman that I met in a homeless shelter."

The video was made at and around Angel tube station in Islington, London, and was uploaded to YouTube on 22 April 2010. It depicts the story of a young woman addicted to drugs, portrayed by Selina MacDonald, who's seen trying to earn money selling The Big Issue magazine on the streets of London, actually selling one to Sheeran himself. The girl's struggles, both financial and existential, result in her prostituting herself to get money to buy crack. In the end, the girl dies alone in her room from her drug use, the outcome being the preface of the video, where a tearful grieving woman can be seen beside her corpse. An acoustic, unplugged version of the song was also uploaded onto the official Ed Sheeran YouTube page on 10 May 2011.

== Live performances ==
Ed Sheeran performed the song on Late Night with Jimmy Fallon on 30 March 2012 and on the talk show Conan on 8 May 2012. Sheeran performed an acoustic version of the song live at the Diamond Jubilee Concert in front of Queen Elizabeth II on 4 June 2012. Sheeran performed the song on The Ellen DeGeneres Show along with "Grade 8" on 4 October 2012 and on Jimmy Kimmel Live! along with "You Need Me, I Don't Need You" on 19 December 2012. Sheeran also performed the song as a duet with Elton John at the 2013 Grammy Awards on 10 February 2013. Sheeran and Olivia Rodrigo performed "The A Team" as a duet at the July 2025 British Summer Time series.

== Cover versions ==
In July 2011, Birdy covered the song at BBC Radio 1's Live Lounge. Luca Hänni, winner of the ninth season of Deutschland sucht den Superstar performed the song in the Top 16 show on 25 February 2012. Kendall Schmidt from Big Time Rush posted a cover of the song on YouTube in June. On 17 June 2012, during One Direction's Up All Night Tour, member Niall Horan covered the song at Anaheim's The Theatre at Honda Center. The X Factor contestant Lucy Spraggan has also used the music from the song, rewriting the lyrics from the perspective of the man who uses the services of the girl of the song, with version entitled "The B Team". X Factor Indonesia contestant "Mikha Angelo" covered the song in the third gala show. Also, the Jonas Brothers covered the song on their tour during Latin America. In 2013 the French movie "Les Gamins" used a cover version by St John's International School choir for its OST On 19 January 2013, singer Masha, covered the song on her YouTube channel, as of November 2013 Masha's cover has received nearly 50,000 views. In January 2013, YouTube stars, Andy Lange and Chester See, made a cover on Lange's channel. The video currently has over 140,000 views.

== Track listing ==
Digital download
No.	Title	Length
1.	"The A Team"	4:18
2.	"The A Team" (Shy FX's Ackee and Saltfish Remix)	4:28
3.	"The A Team" (KOAN Sound Remix)	4:39
4.	"The A Team" (True Tiger Remix)	3:39
5.	"The A Team" (Acoustic)	4:01

CD single
No.	Title	Length
1.	"The A Team"	4:18
2.	"The A Team" (KOAN Sound Remix)	4:39

7-inch vinyl
No.	Title	Length
1.	"The A Team"	4:18
2.	"The A Team" (Shy FX's Ackee and Saltfish Remix)	4:28

== Charts ==
=== Weekly charts ===
Chart (2011–13)	Peak position
Australia (ARIA)	2
Austria (Ö3 Austria Top 40)	19
Belgium (Ultratop 50 Flanders)	18
Belgium (Ultratip Bubbling Under Wallonia)	26
Canada Hot 100 (Billboard)	29
Canada AC (Billboard)	26
Canada CHR/Top 40 (Billboard)	40
Canada Hot AC (Billboard)	38
Czech Republic Airplay (ČNS IFPI)	31
Czech Republic Singles Digital (ČNS IFPI)	83
Euro Digital Songs (Billboard)	7
France (SNEP)	43
Germany (GfK)	9
Hungary (Single Top 40)	3
Iceland (RÚV)	21
Ireland (IRMA)	3
Israel International Airplay (Media Forest)	6
Japan Hot 100 (Billboard)	5
Luxembourg (Billboard)	8
Mexico (Billboard Ingles Airplay)	34
Netherlands (Dutch Top 40)	5
Netherlands (Single Top 100)	2
New Zealand (Recorded Music NZ)	3
Norway (VG-lista)	5
Scottish Singles Sales (Official Charts)	2
Slovakia Airplay (ČNS IFPI)	84
Spain (Promusicae)	44
Sweden (Sverigetopplistan)	27
Switzerland (Schweizer Hitparade)	23
UK Singles (Official Charts)	3
US Billboard Hot 100	16
US Adult Contemporary (Billboard)	11
US Adult Pop Airplay (Billboard)	6
US Hot Rock & Alternative Songs (Billboard)	4
US Pop Airplay (Billboard)	9

=== Year-end charts ===
Chart (2011)	Position
Australia (ARIA)	24
Netherlands (Dutch Top 40)	60
Netherlands (Single Top 100)	76
UK Singles (OCC)	8
Chart (2012)	Position
Australia (ARIA)	91
France (SNEP)	145
Germany (Official German Charts)	83
Japan (Japan Hot 100)	98
Netherlands (Dutch Top 40)	24
Netherlands (Single Top 100)	28
New Zealand (Recorded Music NZ)	30
Sweden (Sverigetopplistan)	60
UK Singles (OCC)	118
US Adult Top 40 (Billboard)	32
Chart (2013)	Position
US Billboard Hot 100	75
US Adult Contemporary (Billboard)	28
US Adult Top 40 (Billboard)	42
US Hot Rock Songs (Billboard)	15

=== Decade-end charts ===
Chart (2010–2019)	Position
Australia (ARIA)	35
UK Singles (OCC)	34

== Certifications ==
Certifications for "The A Team"
Region	Certification	Certified units/sales
Australia (ARIA)	10× Platinum	700,000^{‡}
Austria (IFPI Austria)	2× Platinum	60,000^{*}
Canada (Music Canada)	9× Platinum	720,000^{‡}
Denmark (IFPI Danmark)	3× Platinum	270,000^{‡}
Germany (BVMI)	2× Platinum	1,200,000^{‡}
Italy (FIMI)	Platinum	50,000^{‡}
New Zealand (RMNZ)	6× Platinum	180,000^{‡}
Norway (IFPI Norway)	2× Platinum	20,000^{*}
Spain (Promusicae)	Platinum	60,000^{‡}
Sweden (GLF)	2× Platinum	80,000^{‡}
Switzerland (IFPI Switzerland)	Platinum	30,000^{^}
United Kingdom (BPI)	6× Platinum	3,600,000^{‡}
United States (RIAA)	7× Platinum	7,000,000^{‡}
^{*} Sales figures based on certification alone.^{^} Shipments figures based on certification alone.^{‡} Sales+streaming figures based on certification alone.

== Release history ==
Region	Date	Format	Label
United Kingdom	10 June 2011	Digital download	Lava; Atlantic
United Kingdom	13 June 2011	CD single	Lava; Atlantic
United States	27 August 2012	Contemporary hit radio	Lava; Atlantic

== See also ==
- List of highest-certified singles in Australia
