= Kiss Me (Ed Sheeran song) =

Song by Ed Sheeran

from the album +
- Released: 9 September 2011
- Recorded: January–March 2011
- Genre: Acoustic pop
- Length: 4:40
- Label: Asylum; Atlantic
- Songwriters: Ed Sheeran; Justin Franks; Julie Frost
- Producers: Ed Sheeran; No I.D.

"Kiss Me" is a song written and recorded by English singer-songwriter Ed Sheeran along with Justin Franks and Julie Frost for his debut studio album, + (2011) which appeared as the eleventh track. The song was produced by Sheeran and No I.D.

== Lyrics ==
According to Sheeran, the lyrics of the song describes the relationship between two best friends, who fell in love with each other. The boy falls in love first and it takes a while for the girl to feel the same and in the end, she does. The couple are actually the godparents of Sheeran and he explains the meaning behind the song during the 2012 iTunes Festival.

== Composition ==
"Kiss Me" is written in the key of D major with a moderate tempo.

== Credits and personnel ==
Credits taken from Allmusic and +'s liner notes.

- Ed Sheeran – vocals, acoustic guitar, electric guitar, songwriting, production
- No I.D. – programming

== Charts ==
Chart (2013)	Peak position
Ireland (IRMA)	94
New Zealand (Recorded Music NZ)	29
US Bubbling Under Hot 100 (Billboard)	20

== Certifications ==
Certifications for "Kiss Me"
Region	Certification	Certified units/sales
Canada (Music Canada)	2× Platinum	160,000^{‡}
Denmark (IFPI Danmark)	Gold	45,000^{‡}
Italy (FIMI)	Gold	25,000^{‡}
New Zealand (RMNZ)	Platinum	15,000^{*}
United Kingdom (BPI)	Platinum	600,000^{‡}
United States (RIAA)	2× Platinum	2,000,000^{‡}
^{*} Sales figures based on certification alone.^{‡} Sales+streaming figures based on certification alone.
