= You Need Me, I Don't Need You =

2011 single by Ed Sheeran

Single by Ed Sheeran

from the album +
- Released: 26 August 2011
- Recorded: 2010; Sticky Studios; (Surrey, England); Dean Street Studios; (London, England)
- Genre: Folk-pop
- Length: 3:40
- Label: Warner; Atlantic
- Songwriter: Ed Sheeran
- Producers: Jake Gosling; Charlie Hugall

Ed Sheeran singles chronology
"Young Guns" (2011)	"You Need Me, I Don't Need You" (2011)	"Lego House" (2011)

Music video
- "You Need Me, I Don't Need You" on YouTube

"You Need Me, I Don't Need You" (or simply "You Need Me") is a song by English singer-songwriter Ed Sheeran. It was released in the United Kingdom on 26 August 2011 as the second single from his debut studio album, + ("Plus").

The track "You Need Me" was originally released on the You Need Me extended play in 2009. The new version of "You Need Me, I Don't Need You" was re-recorded with a heavier beat, and peaked at number 4 on the UK Singles Chart. It was certified platinum by the British Phonographic Industry for exceeding 600,000 units.

== Background ==
During his headline set in the BBC Introducing tent at the Glastonbury Festival 2011, Sheeran revealed that "You Need Me, I Don't Need You" would be his second single. The single was premiered on BBC Radio 1 as Zane Lowe's "Hottest Record in the World" on 6 July 2011. He performed the song live for the SBTV YouTube channel, in which he made an entire song, backing track included, in just 5 minutes using a guitar and loop pedal. This version included lyrics from Sheeran's cousin—rapper Alonestar (Jethro Sheeran)—and reggae group LaidBlak, but the official single release in 2011 included just lyrics written by Ed Sheeran himself.

On 27 July 2011, Zane Lowe also made the Loadstar remix his "Hottest Record in the World". Rizzle Kicks uploaded their remix of the song to YouTube on 14 August 2011. The original verses were replaced with their own lyrics, while Sheeran sings the chorus.

== Composition ==
According to the sheet music published by EMI Music Publishing, the folk-pop song is written in the key of E minor; Sheeran's vocals range from the note of D_{3} to G_{4}. Instrumentation is provided by guitar, piano and a drum loop.

== Critical reception ==
Writing for the Star-Ledger, Tris McCall described "You Need Me, I Don't Need You as "a frenetically strummed, wordy kiss-off, and the climax of +." Lewis Corner of Digital Spy gave a 4/5 rating of song, stating:

'I sing, I write my own tune/ And I write my own verse, hell/ Don't need another wordsmith to make the tune sell,' he sing-speaks over an acoustic hip-hop beat complete with head-nodding guitar riff - marking a swift departure from the saccharine singer-songwriter sound of his heart-tugging debut. 'They say I'm up and coming like I'm f**king in an elevator,' he quips with steely conviction, prompting the response, 'We know you're a real artiste now, but there's no need to be cocky!'

== Live performances ==
On 24 June 2011, Sheeran performed the song at Glastonbury Festival 2011 on the BBC Introducing Stage as well as live at the iTunes Festival on 8 July 2011 and at the 2011 Reading and Leeds Festivals. Sheeran also performed the track at the BBC Radio 1 Teen Awards on 9 October 2011 at Wembley Arena. At Sheeran's Brixton concert, on 21 January 2012, his performance of the song concluded the gig and included appearances from Rizzle Kicks, Wretch 32 and Devlin, with the performance lasting over 15 minutes. However he has also played the song at various local concerts before making it as a mainstream artist, the very first performance is believed to be at a gig where Sheeran was supported by a band named We Can't Dance. On 21 April 2012, Ed played the song live for the Aragon Ballroom in Chicago while touring with Snow Patrol for the Fallen Empires tour. On Sunday 25 June, he closed his set and the Glastonbury Festival 2017 with the song. Sheeran used the song to close the encore sets of approximately 97% of shows on his Divide Tour, which concluded in 2019.

== Music video ==
A music video to accompany the release of "You Need Me, I Don't Need You" was first released on YouTube on 19 July 2011. The music video was directed by Shane Ramirez. It features signing actor Matthew Jacobs Morgan.

== Track listings ==
Digital download / CD single
No.	Title	Length
1.	"You Need Me, I Don't Need You"	3:40
2.	"You Need Me, I Don't Need You" (Live Ustream Version)	6:51
3.	"You Need Me, I Don't Need You" (featuring Wretch 32 & Devlin)	3:03
4.	"You Need Me, I Don't Need You" (Loadstar Remix)	5:01
5.	"You Need Me, I Don't Need You" (Gemini Remix)	4:30

Alternate CD single
No.	Title	Length
1.	"You Need Me, I Don't Need You"	3:40
2.	"You Need Me, I Don't Need You" (featuring Wretch 32 & Devlin)	3:03
3.	"You Need Me, I Don't Need You" (Live Ustream Version)	6:51
4.	"You Need Me, I Don't Need You" (Loadstar Remix)	5:01
5.	"You Need Me, I Don't Need You" (Culprate Remix)	4:02

7" vinyl
No.	Title	Length
1.	"You Need Me, I Don't Need You"	3:40
2.	"You Need Me, I Don't Need You" (Acoustic Version)	4:18

== Credits and personnel ==
- Vocals, lyrics, acoustic guitar, electric guitar, piano, bass guitar, percussion, beat-box – Ed Sheeran
- Producer, programming – Jake Gosling
- Producer, additional drums and percussion – Charlie Hugall
- Bass guitar, acoustic guitar, electric guitar – Chris Leonard
- Piano – Tom Greenwood
- Drums – Ben Scott Hollingsworth (Ben Scott)
- Mastering – Christian Wright
- Label – Warner Music Group

== Charts and certifications ==
=== Weekly charts ===
Chart (2011–12)	Peak position
Australia (ARIA)	74
Belgium (Ultratip Bubbling Under Flanders)	11
Belgium (Ultratip Bubbling Under Wallonia)	8
Euro Digital Songs (Billboard)	5
Ireland (IRMA)	19
Scotland Singles (Official Charts)	5
UK Singles (Official Charts)	4
UK Indie (Official Charts)	19 (Note: The single "You Need Me, I Don't Need You" peaked at number nineteen on the independent releases chart for the week ending 4 June 2011 following downloading from the You Need Me extended play. Upon release through Warner Music Group in August 2011, the single became ineligible for the respective chart.)
UK Hip Hop/R&B (Official Charts)	1

=== Year-end charts ===
Chart (2011)	Position
UK Singles (Official Charts Company)	106

=== Certifications ===
Certifications for You Need Me, I Don't Need You
Region	Certification	Certified units/sales
Canada (Music Canada)	Gold	40,000^{‡}
Denmark (IFPI Danmark)	Gold	45,000^{‡}
New Zealand (RMNZ)	Gold	7,500^{*}
United Kingdom (BPI)	Platinum	600,000^{‡}
United States (RIAA)	Gold	500,000^{‡}
^{*} Sales figures based on certification alone.^{‡} Sales+streaming figures based on certification alone.

== Release history ==
Region	Date	Format	Label
United Kingdom	26 August 2011	7"; CD; digital download	Warner
