= + (album) =

2011 studio album by Ed Sheeran

Studio album by Ed Sheeran
- Released: 9 September 2011
- Recorded: January–March 2011
- Genres: Folk-pop; hip-hop
- Length: 49:53
- Labels: Asylum; Atlantic
- Producers: Jake Gosling; Charlie Hugall; No I.D.; Ed Sheeran

Ed Sheeran chronology
| No.5 Collaborations Project (2011) | + (2011) | The Slumdon Bridge (2012) |

Singles from +
- 1. "The A Team" Released: 10 June 2011; 2. "You Need Me, I Don't Need You" Released: 26 August 2011; 3. "Lego House" Released: 13 November 2011; 4. "Drunk" Released: 19 February 2012; 5. "Small Bump" Released: 25 May 2012; 6. "Give Me Love" Released: 21 November 2012

+ (Plus) is the debut studio album by the English singer-songwriter Ed Sheeran. It was released on 9 September 2011 by Asylum Records and Atlantic Records. The album is considered Sheeran's commercial breakthrough. He previously released five EPs independently. Jake Gosling and Sheeran produced the majority of the album, with additional production by American hip hop producer No I.D.

Media interest surrounding + was heightened by its two preceding singles—"The A Team" and "You Need Me, I Don't Need You"—which peaked at numbers three and four on the UK Singles Chart, respectively. "Lego House" was released on 11 November 2011 as the album's third single and matched the chart success of its predecessors, peaking at number five in the UK. Three additional singles—"Drunk", "Small Bump", and "Give Me Love"—were released throughout the following year, all charting within the top 25 of the UK Singles Chart. Worldwide, the album has sold more than 4 million copies.

The album was met with generally positive reviews from music critics. Upon release, + debuted atop of the UK Albums Chart with first-week sales exceeding 102,000 copies. The album performed well on the US Billboard 200, peaking at number five, selling 42,000 copies. The album was the highest debut for a British artist's first studio album in the US since Susan Boyle's I Dreamed a Dream in 2009. + is the ninth best-selling album of the 2010s in the United Kingdom.

== Background ==
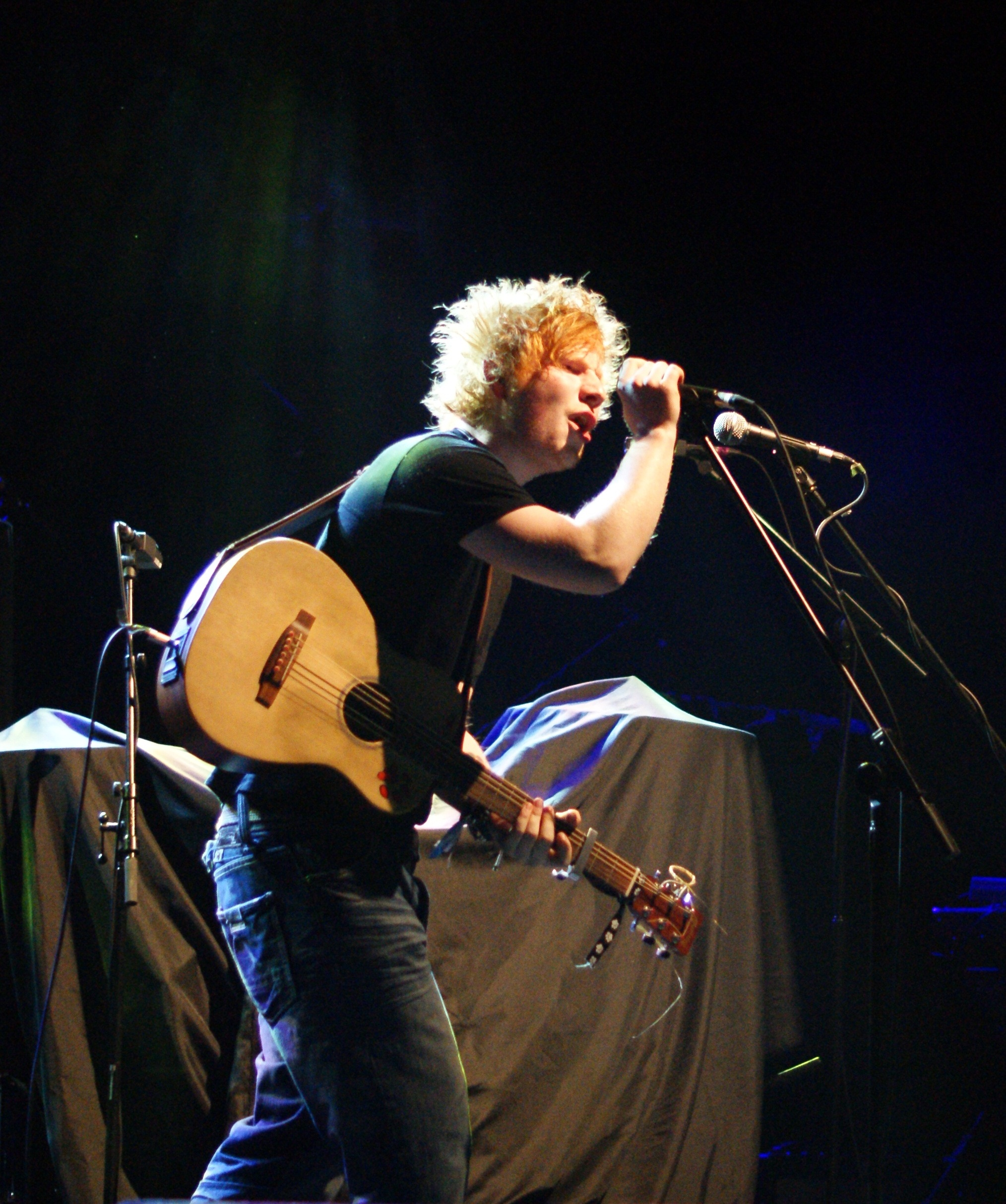
Sheeran performing at Academy 1 in Manchester.

After completing school at age 16, Sheeran spent his student grant on rail tickets. Moving from place to place, he performed at open mic nights across the United Kingdom, where he would sleep on his friends' sofas spending time self-releasing homemade EPs and albums. After spending four years performing in the British live scene, Sheeran met singer Jamie Foxx in Los Angeles, and Foxx liked Sheeran enough to "put [Sheeran] on the path to success".

In early 2010, Sheeran was having what he described as a "rough time" in the UK, and he spontaneously left for Los Angeles to spend a month "to see what could happen". After performing a gig in the city, he was approached by Foxx's contact, who produced open mic nights endorsed by Foxx. She invited him to perform, which he agreed to, and after the performance he was contacted by Foxx's manager, who then asked him to perform on Foxx's radio show. After performing on the radio show, Foxx gave Sheeran his number offering studio time free of charge. Sheeran took the opportunity to record several tracks in the studio and attended several parties with Foxx, describing the time as "surreal". In addition, Sheeran's appearances on YouTube also garnered success when he uploaded a performance of track "You Need Me, I Don't Need You", which garnered over half a million views, making him "one of the most talked about UK acts".

Following this, Sheeran signed to Atlantic Records and was signed to Elton John's management team called Rocket, which Sheeran discussed, saying: "Elton walked in and said, 'Where's Ed Sheeran?' I was like, 'F-ing hell! He knows my name!' It's surreal, growing up listening to his music and now he is one of the people who sings my praises and helps my career and rings me up and actually has an interest in me". Sheeran started performing with the acoustic guitar aged 11 and his love for the instrument was what "got [him] into music and singing". His musical inspirations from an early age surfaced from The Beatles and Bob Dylan, but he noted Damien Rice as a larger influence on his music whom he met after an intimate performance in Dublin. Throughout the production of +, Sheeran knew "how [he] wanted every single song to sound", and because of this they only took around one day each to record, with the final product featuring "the same sound", which he described as an achievement.

== Music ==
"I'm always being introduced to new people that are really good. Being a songwriter myself, I love the way they put lyrics together. If you listen to Ghetts' flow, it's not necessarily like four-bar, four-bar, four-bar. He'll do a two and a half bar rhyme and then stop, and go into something else. And me as a songwriter, that sort of fascinated me, like how can you get away with that? That really interested me. I've started writing songs a bit more like that, lyrically."

— Sheeran explaining the influence of the "Grime" style on +.

+ is influenced by rapper Eminem, hip-hop inspired duo Nizlopi and recording artist Damien Rice. Sheeran performs throughout the record with a small acoustic guitar, with "no band" and "no beats". The Daily Telegraph found that the lyricism is based around subjects he cares about in his own life, performing with a "soft toned, flexible voice" with a hip-hop theme. The record features "chipper" beats with staccato guitar riffs throughout. It differs between genres, with tracks such as "Grade 8" showing R&B influences, garnering comparisons to Bruno Mars, while the album also features folk-hop inspired tracks such as "Drunk", a "self-pitying, doomed attempt to resurrect a lost relationship". Lyricism also derives from Sheeran's own "self-doubt" heard in tracks such as "Wake Me Up" and "Kiss Me", which has been compared to musician Van Morrison. The record also visits a "darker side" on tracks such as "The City", which depicts homeless street-life and features Sheeran beatboxing. The album concludes with the track "Give Me Love" and the Scottish folk song "The Parting Glass" as a bonus track.

== Critical reception ==
Professional ratings
Aggregate scores
| Source | Rating |
|---|---|
| AnyDecentMusic? | 5.7/10 |
| Metacritic | 67/100 |
Review scores
| Source | Rating |
| AllMusic | 3/5 stars |
| The Daily Telegraph | 3/5 stars |
| Entertainment Weekly | B− |
| The Guardian | 3/5 stars |
| The Independent | 4/5 stars |
| London Evening Standard | 4/5 stars |
| NME | 4/10 |
| The Observer | 2/5 stars |
| The Scotsman | 2/5 stars |
| State | 3/5 stars |

"Experimentation with styles and the melding of musical approaches is to be commended, obviously; but to relate authenticity with consistent, similar output is something very wrong indeed, as not everybody singing the same song is coming from the same place. These charting mutations and variations have as much to do with our culture of instant gratification as they do with music growing out-of-date more quickly – and what better person to stand tall at the lectern than 20-year-old Ed Sheeran, whose unlikely combination of acoustic folk and grime has seen him become one of 2011's biggest domestic successes."

— Natalie Shaw of BBC Music.

At Metacritic, which assigns a normalized rating out of 100 to reviews from mainstream critics, the album received an average score of 67, based on 9 reviews, which indicates "generally favorable reviews". Andy Gill of The Independent gave the album four stars out of five, finding that Sheeran was right to follow his own "instincts" and not conform to mainstream pop music, saying: "if he had followed the advice to tone down the crackhead portrait of 'The A Team', Sheeran might have wound up with a respectable, if predictable, career as a mainstream folkie singer-songwriter rocking the outer reaches of Radio Two" but found his "nimble hip-hop delivery rides a slick R&B groove" and his "blue-collar sensibilities cut through" after not attending schools such as the Brits school. Alex Petridis of The Guardian gave the album three out of five stars, writing that, "at its worst, + is a pretty winsome business"; Petridis found the lyricism of tracks such as "Wake Me Up" weak, but stated that, "apart from his teen appeal, Sheeran's strength is his melodic ability, a way with a really strong, radio-friendly tune, as on 'The City' or 'Grade 8'". However, Petridis concluded his review by stating: "You can't help wishing he'd put said ability to slightly more edgy use, but then again, he still might: at least there's evidence that Ed Sheeran might still be around when the screaming girls grow up and calm down." Jon O'Brien of AllMusic found that Sheeran failed to "capitalize on his unique selling point", stating: "Indeed, the unexpected hugely popular response to lead single 'The A Team', an achingly tender tale of a heroin-addicted prostitute (think a socially aware James Blunt) seems to have thrown him off course, as rather than pursue the more urban direction that set him apart from his contemporaries, the majority of Plus' 12 tracks feel like self-conscious attempts to replicate its sound".

Natalie Shaw of BBC Music gave the album a mixed response, calling + at times "precocious" and "self-referencing", with the track "You Need Me, I Don't Need You" being listed as an example of this. However, in contrast, she found "Drunk" to be sweet, considered "Grade 8" a standout track, and positively commented on the chorus of track "The City". In conclusion, Shaw stated: "+ will give Sheeran's rabid fanbase a lot to love, but it'll also make him an easy target for critics hungry for new directions in pop, as it fails to really gel the man's loves of folk and rap. If he ditches his bottom-of-a-Tube-escalator ballads (see 'Kiss Me') and stops trying to show off, Sheeran could well become a thrilling proposition over an entire long-player, rather than just in all-too-brief moments of magic." John Lewis of newspaper Metro gave the album a mixed review. He stating that Sheeran "is at his best when he combines both worlds. Accompanying himself on acoustic guitar, his lovelorn ballads will suddenly lurch into verbose, rhythmically complex rhymes that display all the verbal dexterity of a grime MC". However, Lewis also found that Sheeran failed to maintain the success throughout, performing "gloopy" and "anonymous" ballads. Emily Mackay of NME gave the album four out of ten marks, questioning his authenticity as a musician. She wrote: "He's got the touches of 'urban' styling with flimsy hip-hop rhythms and Plan B-lite veering between half-arsed rapping and boyband emoting. He's got the 'issues' songs (the Dido-ish, maudlin 'Drunk', the omnipresent saccharine horror of the drugs/homelessness/prostitution triple-whammy of 'The A-Team')". She concluded her review by noting that "There's little here that moves on from the kind of trip-hop balladeers that abounded in the late '90s".

== Commercial performance ==
In the United Kingdom, midweek sales reports showed that + was set to top the UK Albums Chart, although Digital Spy reported that it still faced competition from Laura Marling's album A Creature I Don't Know. For the week of 18 September 2011, + debuted atop the UK Albums Chart with first-week sales of 102,000 copies. After the album topped the chart, Sheeran wrote on his Twitter account "No. 1 album and 2 songs in the top 20! mental! Thank you all so much!", and then added "Here's my THANK YOU for getting my album to #1! Hope you enjoy it", including a link to download a free EP. The EP featured three tracks: "Fire Alarms", "She" and a remix of single "You Need Me, I Don't Need You". By the end of 2011, the album had been certified Triple Platinum, indicating sales of over 900,000 copies. As of June 2015, the album has sold 1,958,000 copies in the UK, making it the sixth-best-selling album of the 2010s and the 44th-best-selling album of the 21st century. It is also one of the longest-charting albums in UK chart history, with over 200 weeks on the UK Albums Chart.

In Ireland, the album was placed in the top 10 for 8 consecutive years, from 2011 to 2018. In Australia, the album debuted at number 41 on the ARIA Albums Chart for the week commencing 31 October 2011, peaking at number one on 13 August 2012. The album has been certified Triple Platinum by the Australian Recording Industry Association (ARIA). By January 2013, the album had spent 65 consecutive weeks on the ARIA Albums Chart and was still in the Top 5. It reached the top 10 in 6 non-consecutive years, in 2011, 2012, 2013, 2015, 2017 and 2018, including a placement at No. 6 in its 222nd charting week in March 2018. In New Zealand, the album debuted at number 34 and ultimately topped the chart 54 weeks later. + debuted at number five on the Billboard 200 in the United States, selling 42,000 units in its first week. As of March 2017, + has sold 1.21 million copies in the United States.

== Tour dates ==
Ed Sheeran announced in May 2011 a 21 date UK & Ireland tour where he played songs from the newly released album. Sheeran then went on to add further dates for the start of 2012 and it was confirmed he would be playing his largest gig yet at Brixton Academy. Ed Sheeran would be touring the US for the first time in early 2012 by supporting Snow Patrol on their Fallen Empires Tour. It was announced that Sheeran would be touring Australia and New Zealand for the first time in the July and August 2012. Sheeran then announced in January that he would be doing his first headline tour of the US and his largest headline shows to date in the UK. Before supporting Taylor Swift on her The Red Tour, Sheeran embarked on an 18 date tour across the US.

== Track listing ==
All tracks produced by Jake Gosling, except where noted.

Standard edition
| No. | Title | Writer(s) | Producer(s) | Length |
|---|---|---|---|---|
| 1. | "The A Team" | Ed Sheeran | | 4:18 |
| 2. | "Drunk" | Sheeran; Gosling | | 3:20 |
| 3. | "U.N.I." | Sheeran; Gosling | | 3:48 |
| 4. | "Grade 8" | Sheeran; True Tiger | Gosling; Charlie Hugall^{[a]} | 2:59 |
| 5. | "Wake Me Up" | Sheeran; Gosling | | 3:49 |
| 6. | "Small Bump" | Sheeran | | 4:19 |
| 7. | "This" | Sheeran; Gordon Mills Jr. | | 3:15 |
| 8. | "The City" | Sheeran; Gosling | | 3:54 |
| 9. | "Lego House" | Sheeran; Gosling; Chris Leonard | | 3:05 |
| 10. | "You Need Me, I Don't Need You" | Sheeran | Gosling; Hugall | 3:40 |
| 11. | "Kiss Me" | Sheeran; Justin Franks; Julie Frost | Sheeran; No I.D. | 4:40 |
| 12. | "Give Me Love" (followed by the hidden track, "The Parting Glass") | Sheeran; Gosling; Leonard | | 8:46 |
| Total length: | | | | 49:53 |

Deluxe edition
| No. | Title | Writer(s) | Length |
|---|---|---|---|
| 13. | "Autumn Leaves" | Sheeran; Gosling | 3:20 |
| 14. | "Little Bird" | Sheeran | 3:44 |
| 15. | "Gold Rush" | Sheeran; Amy Wadge | 4:03 |
| 16. | "Sunburn" | Sheeran | 4:35 |
| Total length: | | | 65:35 |

Notes

- ^{^[a]} signifies an additional producer
- The Japanese CD edition includes "The A Team" (acoustic version).
- The Japanese digital edition includes "Sofa", "Homeless", and "Lego House" (music video).
- The Australian deluxe edition includes a DVD: Live from O_{2} Shepherd's Bush Empire, London.
- "The City", "You Need Me, I Don't Need You" and "Sunburn" are all re-recorded versions from 2009's You Need Me EP, whereas "The A Team", "Little Bird", "Sofa", and "Homeless" originally appeared on the 2010 Loose Change EP.

== Personnel ==
Credits taken from Allmusic and +'s liner notes.

- Ed Sheeran – vocals and acoustic guitar , beat box (8, 10), bass (2, 10), electric guitar (1, 2, 4, 6, 8–11, 14), handclaps (12), percussion (10), piano (5, 10)
- Jake Gosling – backing vocals (12), drums (10), handclapping (12), keyboards (2, 3, 6, 8, 14), piano (1, 4, 9), programming (1, 2, 4, 6, 8–10, 12–16), string arrangements (12), strings (1, 13)
- Chris Leonard – acoustic guitar (3, 4, 9, 12), backing vocals (12), bass (3, 9), electric guitar (3–5, 7, 15), handclaps (12)
- Anna Leddra Chapman – backing vocals (3)
- Louisa Fuller – violin (track 12)
- Tom Greenwood – piano (track 10)
- Sally Herbert – string arrangements (12)
- Ben Hollingsworth – drums (10)
- Charlie Hugall – additional drums and percussion (10)
- Oli Langford – violin (12)
- John Metcalfe – viola (12)
- No I.D. – programming (11)
- Chris Worsey – cello (12)

== Production ==
- Produced by Jake Gosling (1–10, 12–16), Charlie Hugall (10), Ed Sheeran (11), No I.D. (11)
  - All Tracks Co-Produced by Ed Sheeran
- Recorded by Jake Gosling (1–4, 6, 8–10, 12–16), Guy Massey (5, 7), Charlie Hugall (10), Rob Kinaelski (11)
  - Additional Recording by Guy Massey (3, 9, 12), Charlie Hugall (4)
  - Assisted by Edd Hartwell (2–5, 9, 12)
  - Additional Vocal Recording by Ruadhri Cushnan (9)
- Mixed by Jake Gosling (1, 13–16), Ruadhri Cushnan (2–4, 6, 8, 9, 12), Guy Massey (5, 7), Charlie Hugall (10), Rob Kinaelski (11)
  - Assisted by Grant Rawlinson and Marco Martini (2–4, 6, 8, 9, 12), Anna Ugarte (11)
  - Vocals Mixed by Jake Gosling (11)
- Mastering by Christian Wright
- Illustrations by Phillip Butah
- Executive Production by Ben Cook and Ed Howard
- Managed by Stuart Camp

== Charts ==
=== Weekly charts ===
Weekly chart performance for +
| Chart (2011–2020) | Peak position |
|---|---|
| Australian Albums (ARIA) | 1 |
| Austrian Albums (Ö3 Austria) | 21 |
| Belgian Albums (Ultratop Flanders) | 9 |
| Belgian Albums (Ultratop Wallonia) | 38 |
| Canadian Albums (Billboard) | 5 |
| Czech Albums (ČNS IFPI) | 60 |
| Danish Albums (Hitlisten) | 13 |
| Dutch Albums (Album Top 100) | 8 |
| Finnish Albums (Suomen virallinen lista) | 34 |
| French Albums (SNEP) | 44 |
| German Albums (Offizielle Top 100) | 12 |
| Hungarian Albums (MAHASZ) | 12 |
| Irish Albums (IRMA) | 1 |
| Italian Albums (FIMI) | 28 |
| Japanese Albums (Oricon) | 75 |
| Mexican Albums (Top 100 Mexico) | 61 |
| New Zealand Albums (RMNZ) | 1 |
| Norwegian Albums (VG-lista) | 11 |
| Polish Albums (ZPAV) | 40 |
| Scottish Albums (Official Charts) | 1 |
| Spanish Albums (Promusicae) | 59 |
| Swedish Albums (Sverigetopplistan) | 19 |
| Swiss Albums (Schweizer Hitparade) | 2 |
| UK Albums (Official Charts) | 1 |
| US Billboard 200 | 5 |
| US Americana/Folk Albums (Billboard) | 1 |
| US Top Rock Albums (Billboard) | 2 |

=== Year-end charts ===
2011 year-end chart performance for +
| Chart (2011) | Position |
|---|---|
| Australian Albums (ARIA) | 58 |
| Irish Albums (IRMA) | 19 |
| UK Albums (OCC) | 9 |

2012 year-end chart performance for +
| Chart (2012) | Position |
|---|---|
| Australian Albums (ARIA) | 5 |
| Belgian Albums (Ultratop Flanders) | 50 |
| Canadian Albums (Billboard) | 48 |
| Dutch Albums (MegaCharts) | 22 |
| Irish Albums (IRMA) | 3 |
| New Zealand Albums (RMNZ) | 2 |
| Swiss Albums (Schweizer Hitparade) | 54 |
| UK Albums (OCC) | 3 |
| US Billboard 200 | 136 |
| US Folk Albums (Billboard) | 7 |
| US Rock Albums (Billboard) | 37 |

2013 year-end chart performance for +
| Chart (2013) | Position |
|---|---|
| Australian Albums (ARIA) | 12 |
| Belgian Albums (Ultratop Flanders) | 99 |
| Dutch Albums (MegaCharts) | 53 |
| Irish Albums (IRMA) | 17 |
| New Zealand Albums (RMNZ) | 6 |
| UK Albums (OCC) | 47 |
| US Billboard 200 | 46 |
| US Folk Albums (Billboard) | 3 |
| US Rock Albums (Billboard) | 8 |

2014 year-end chart performance for +
| Chart (2014) | Position |
|---|---|
| Australian Albums (ARIA) | 38 |
| Dutch Albums (MegaCharts) | 71 |
| New Zealand Albums (RMNZ) | 17 |
| Swedish Albums (Sverigetopplistan) | 29 |
| UK Albums (OCC) | 51 |
| US Billboard 200 | 122 |

2015 year-end chart performance for +
| Chart (2015) | Position |
|---|---|
| Australian Albums (ARIA) | 30 |
| Danish Albums (Hitlisten) | 50 |
| Irish Albums (IRMA) | 20 |
| New Zealand Albums (RMNZ) | 23 |
| Swedish Albums (Sverigetopplistan) | 41 |
| UK Albums (OCC) | 38 |
| US Billboard 200 | 59 |

2016 year-end chart performance for +
| Chart (2016) | Position |
|---|---|
| Danish Albums (Hitlisten) | 65 |
| Swedish Albums (Sverigetopplistan) | 73 |

2017 year-end chart performance for +
| Chart (2017) | Position |
|---|---|
| Australian Albums (ARIA) | 12 |
| Danish Albums (Hitlisten) | 44 |
| Swedish Albums (Sverigetopplistan) | 56 |
| UK Albums (OCC) | 16 |
| US Billboard 200 | 195 |
| US Rock Albums (Billboard) | 31 |

2018 year-end chart performance for +
| Chart (2018) | Position |
|---|---|
| Australian Albums (ARIA) | 23 |
| Danish Albums (Hitlisten) | 80 |
| Icelandic Albums (Plötutíóindi) | 87 |
| Irish Albums (IRMA) | 36 |
| UK Albums (OCC) | 57 |

2019 year-end chart performance for +
| Chart (2019) | Position |
|---|---|
| Australian Albums (ARIA) | 77 |
| Belgian Albums (Ultratop Flanders) | 196 |
| UK Albums (OCC) | 73 |

2020 year-end chart performance for +
| Chart (2020) | Position |
|---|---|
| UK Albums (OCC) | 99 |

2021 year-end chart performance for +
| Chart (2021) | Position |
|---|---|
| Australian Albums (ARIA) | 100 |

=== Decade-end charts ===
Decade-end chart performance for +
| Chart (2010–2019) | Position |
|---|---|
| Australian Albums (ARIA) | 9 |
| UK Albums (OCC) | 7 |
| US Billboard 200 | 176 |

== Certifications ==
Certifications for +
| Region | Certification | Certified units/sales |
|---|---|---|
| Australia (ARIA) | 6× Platinum | 420,000^{^} |
| Austria (IFPI Austria) | Platinum | 20,000^{*} |
| Canada (Music Canada) | 5× Platinum | 400,000^{‡} |
| Denmark (IFPI Danmark) | 3× Platinum | 60,000^{‡} |
| France (SNEP) | Gold | 50,000^{*} |
| Germany (BVMI) | 3× Gold | 300,000^{‡} |
| Ireland (IRMA) | 6× Platinum | 90,000^{^} |
| Italy (FIMI) | Platinum | 50,000^{‡} |
| Netherlands (NVPI) | Gold | 25,000^{^} |
| New Zealand (RMNZ) | 8× Platinum | 120,000^{‡} |
| Poland (ZPAV) | 2× Platinum | 40,000^{‡} |
| Singapore (RIAS) | Platinum | 10,000^{*} |
| Sweden (GLF) | Platinum | 40,000^{‡} |
| Switzerland (IFPI Switzerland) | Gold | 15,000^{^} |
| United Kingdom (BPI) | 9× Platinum | 2,817,817 |
| United States (RIAA) | 3× Platinum | 3,000,000^{‡} |
Summaries
| Europe (IFPI) | 2× Platinum | 2,000,000^{*} |
^{*} Sales figures based on certification alone.^{^} Shipments figures based on certification alone.^{‡} Sales+streaming figures based on certification alone.

== Release history ==
Release history and formats for +
| Region | Date | Format(s) | Label |
|---|---|---|---|
| Ireland | 9 September 2011 | CD; digital download (standard, deluxe) | Asylum Records; Atlantic Records |
| United Kingdom | 12 September 2011 | CD; digital download (standard, deluxe); LP (standard) | Asylum Records; Atlantic Records |
| Japan | 13 September 2011 | CD; digital download (standard, special) | Warner Music |
| Australia | 23 September 2011 | CD; digital download | Warner Music |
| Netherlands | 18 November 2011 | CD; digital download | Warner Music |
| Switzerland | 13 January 2012 | CD; digital download | Warner Music |
| Poland | 16 January 2012 | CD; digital download | Warner Music |
| Germany | 10 February 2012 | CD; digital download | Warner Music |
| Argentina | 15 May 2012 | CD; digital download | Warner Music |
| United States | 12 June 2012 | CD; digital download | Elektra Records |

== See also ==
- List of UK Albums Chart number ones of the 2010s
- List of number-one albums of 2012 (Australia)
- List of number-one albums of 2012 (Ireland)
- List of number-one albums of 2013 (Ireland)
