= Lego House =

2011 single by Ed Sheeran

Single by Ed Sheeran

from the album +
- B-side: "Grade 8"
- Released: 11 November 2011
- Genre: Folk-pop
- Length: 3:03
- Label: Warner
- Songwriters: Ed Sheeran; Jake Gosling; Chris Leonard
- Producer: Jake Gosling

Ed Sheeran singles chronology
"You Need Me, I Don't Need You" (2011)	"Lego House" (2011)	"Drunk" (2012)

Music video
- "Lego House" on YouTube "Lego House" (Lego Version) on YouTube

"Lego House" is a song by English singer-songwriter Ed Sheeran. It was released on 11 November 2011 as the third single lifted from his debut studio album + (pronounced "plus") of 2011. It was released as the second single in the US on 11 February 2013. It was written by Sheeran, Jake Gosling and Chris Leonard, and produced by Jake Gosling.

The song received its first radio play on Zane Lowe's BBC Radio 1 show on 8 September 2011 and was Sheeran's first song to make the BBC Radio 2 playlist. The remix featuring P Money premiered on MistaJam's BBC Radio 1Xtra show on 30 September 2011. The music video stars Rupert Grint, as a play on his physical resemblance to Sheeran. The song did well worldwide, reaching top five on Australia, Ireland, New Zealand, and the UK Singles Chart, and top fifty on other countries including United States.

== Composition ==
'Lego House' is about that moment in a relationship when you realise where it's going and you want to save it. I tried to be creative and imaginative, using Lego as a metaphor for the relationship.

— Ed Sheeran, A Visual Journey (2014)

According to the sheet music published by Jordan James EMI Music Publishing, "Lego House" is a bass song written in the key of B major; Sheeran's vocals range from the note of B_{2} to G#_{4}. Instrumentation is provided by guitar and piano.

== Commercial performance ==
The song peaked at No. 5 in its sixth week on the singles chart in the United Kingdom. As of September 2017, the song has sold 812,000 copies in the United Kingdom, which together with 29 million streams give a total of 1,105,000 in combined units.

== Music videos ==
Screenshot of the music video for "Lego House", showing Rupert Grint cuddling a hand-made doll with Sheeran's face on it.

The music video for "Lego House" was filmed at the Forum, University of Hertfordshire. It stars actor Rupert Grint. It was released on 20 October 2011 on Sheeran's YouTube channel.

The video's narrative seemingly portrays Grint as Sheeran, performing such activities as writing song lyrics on a pad of paper, lounging in his tour bus, and ultimately going onto the stage for a cheering crowd. However, after he takes the stage, security immediately tackles him, and Grint is slowly revealed to be in fact an obsessive fan of Sheeran, and the events of the video turn out to be him stalking the real Sheeran with increasing severity and mental instability (writing the song was transcribing lyrics from the album booklet, and lounging in the bus was him breaking into it). The video ends with the two running into each other as Grint is forcibly removed from the music venue and Sheeran comes out of a lift on his way to perform.

A "Lego-fied" version of the original music video for "Lego House" was released on 11 April 2013 on The Warner Sound's YouTube channel. The video is a shot-for-shot recreation in LEGO bricks, directed by Shane Ramirez. The music video also got nominated for 2013 MTV Video Music Awards for Best Male Video before losing out to Bruno Mars' "Locked Out of Heaven". Grint reprises his role in the music video for "A Little More", taken from Sheeran's 2025 album Play.

== Live performances ==
In June 2023, during his +−=÷× Tour in Toronto, Sheeran performed the song with Canadian singer Shawn Mendes. In August 2023, Sheeran performed the song outside the Lego store in the Mall of America.

== Formats and track listings ==
Digital download
No.	Title	Length
1.	"Lego House" (acoustic)	3:07
2.	"Lego House" (Gosling Remix) (featuring P Money)	3:50
3.	"Lego House" (The Prototypes Remix)	4:24
4.	"Lego House" (Subscape Remix)	5:10
5.	"Grade 8" (acoustic)	3:00

CD single
No.	Title	Length
1.	"Lego House"	3:04
2.	"Grade 8" (acoustic)	3:00

7" vinyl
No.	Title	Length
1.	"Lego House"	3:05
2.	"Grade 8" (acoustic)	3:00

== Credits and personnel ==
- Lead vocals – Ed Sheeran
- Producers – Jake Gosling
- Lyrics – Ed Sheeran, Jake Gosling, Chris Leonard
- Label – Warner Music Group

== Charts ==
=== Weekly charts ===
Chart (2011–13)	Peak position
Australia (ARIA)	4
Austria (Ö3 Austria Top 40)	59
Belgium (Ultratop 50 Flanders)	6
Belgium (Ultratip Bubbling Under Wallonia)	3
Canada Hot 100 (Billboard)	54
Canada AC (Billboard)	42
Canada CHR/Top 40 (Billboard)	46
Canada Hot AC (Billboard)	46
Czech Republic Airplay (ČNS IFPI)	34
Euro Digital Song Sales (Billboard)	8
Germany (GfK)	51
Hungary (Rádiós Top 40)	18
Ireland (IRMA)	5
Israel International Airplay (Media Forest)	8
Lebanon (The Official Lebanese Top 20)	16
Netherlands (Dutch Top 40)	12
Netherlands (Single Top 100)	25
New Zealand (Recorded Music NZ)	5
Scottish Singles Sales (Official Charts)	6
Switzerland (Schweizer Hitparade)	59
UK Singles (Official Charts)	5
UK Airplay (Music Week)	4
US Billboard Hot 100	42
US Adult Contemporary (Billboard)	26
US Adult Pop Airplay (Billboard)	10
US Hot Rock & Alternative Songs (Billboard)	6
US Pop Airplay (Billboard)	20

Chart (2026)	Peak position
Philippines (Philippines Hot 100)	98

=== Year-end charts ===
Chart (2011)	Position
UK Singles (OCC)	40

Chart (2012)	Position
Australia (ARIA)	14
Belgium (Ultratop 50 Flanders)	74
Netherlands (Dutch Top 40)	65
New Zealand (Recorded Music NZ)	20
UK Singles (OCC)	82

Chart (2013)	Position
US Adult Top 40 (Billboard)	41
US Hot Rock Songs (Billboard)	22

== Certifications ==
Certifications for "Lego House"
Region	Certification	Certified units/sales
Australia (ARIA)	8× Platinum	560,000^{‡}
Austria (IFPI Austria)	Gold	15,000^{*}
Canada (Music Canada)	3× Platinum	240,000^{‡}
Denmark (IFPI Danmark)	2× Platinum	180,000^{‡}
Italy (FIMI)	Platinum	50,000^{‡}
New Zealand (RMNZ)	3× Platinum	90,000^{‡}
Sweden (GLF)	Gold	20,000^{‡}
United Kingdom (BPI)	4× Platinum	2,400,000^{‡}
United States (RIAA)	2× Platinum	2,000,000^{‡}
Streaming
Denmark (IFPI Danmark)	Platinum	1,800,000^{†}
^{*} Sales figures based on certification alone.^{‡} Sales+streaming figures based on certification alone.^{†} Streaming-only figures based on certification alone.
