= We Can't Dance (band) =

English indie rock band

- Origin: Norwich, England
- Genres: Indie rock, Pop
- Years active: 2009 – 2013
- Labels: Current; Unsigned
- Past members: Josie Steward; Tom Joy; Dom Taylor

We Can't Dance were an English indie rock band from Norwich, England.

Their debut single, "Gary Doherty" was released on 10 May 2010. The single entered the UK Indie Chart on 20 May, reaching number 45. It also got to number 22 on the Irish Singles Chart.

Recently the band entered the charts of an independent/unsigned radio station titled Amazing Radio. Their track "Wishful Thinking" made it to number 1 on the charts. Also the band participated in a Children in Need gig at the BBC studios in Norwich on 19 November 2010, whilst featuring on BBC Radio Norfolk the same night.
