= Give Me Love (Ed Sheeran song) =

Single by Ed Sheeran

from the album +
- Released: 21 November 2012
- Genre: Folk; Pop
- Length: 5:26; 8:46 (album version with "The Parting Glass")
- Label: Warner
- Songwriters: Ed Sheeran; Jake Gosling; Chris Leonard
- Producer: Jake Gosling

Ed Sheeran singles chronology
"Watchtower" (2012)	"Give Me Love" (2012)	"Everything Has Changed" (2013)

Music video
- "Give Me Love" on YouTube

"Give Me Love" is a song by English singer-songwriter Ed Sheeran. It was released as the sixth and final single from his debut studio album, + (pronounced "Plus"), on 21 November 2012. The song was written by Sheeran, Jake Gosling and Chris Leonard. The single peaked at number 18 on the UK Singles Chart. On the album, Sheeran's cover of the traditional Irish folk song "The Parting Glass" is included at the end as a hidden track. A cover of the song recorded live at the Capital FM Studios in London on 30 May 2014, is featured on the deluxe version of American singer Demi Lovato's fourth album, Demi.

The music video, directed by Emil Nava, features Australian actress Isabel Lucas.

The song was used in episodes of Cougar Town and The Vampire Diaries.

== Live performances ==
On 11 November 2012, Sheeran performed the song on The X Factor results show. On 16 June 2014, Sheeran performed the song as a duet with Demi Lovato at 104.3 MY FM's My Big Night Out event at the Hollywood Bowl in Los Angeles.

== Track listing ==
Digital download – EP
No.	Title	Length
1.	"Give Me Love" (New Machine Remix) (featuring Mic Righteous)	3:45
2.	"Give Me Love" (True Tiger Remix)	3:34
3.	"Give Me Love" (Xilent Remix)	3:41

Promotional CD single
No.	Title	Length
1.	"Give Me Love" (radio edit)	3:39

== Charts ==
=== Weekly charts ===
Chart (2012–14)	Peak position
Australia (ARIA)	9
Austria (Ö3 Austria Top 40)	68
Belgium (Ultratop 50 Flanders)	38
Belgium (Ultratip Bubbling Under Wallonia)	3
Canada Hot 100 (Billboard)	94
Czech Republic Airplay (ČNS IFPI)	89
Germany (GfK)	71
Hungary (Rádiós Top 40)	36
Ireland (IRMA)	10
Israel International Airplay (Media Forest)	10
Netherlands (Single Top 100)	41
New Zealand (Recorded Music NZ)	12
Scottish Singles Sales (Official Charts)	15
UK Singles (Official Charts)	18
US Bubbling Under Hot 100 (Billboard)	17
US Hot Rock & Alternative Songs (Billboard)	20

=== Year-end charts ===
Chart (2012)	Position
UK Singles (Official Charts Company)	181
Chart (2013)	Position
US Hot Rock Songs (Billboard)	39

== Certifications ==
Region	Certification	Certified units/sales
Australia (ARIA)	6× Platinum	420,000^{‡}
Austria (IFPI Austria)	Gold	15,000^{*}
Canada (Music Canada)	4× Platinum	320,000^{‡}
Denmark (IFPI Danmark)	Platinum	90,000^{‡}
Italy (FIMI)	Platinum	50,000^{‡}
New Zealand (RMNZ)	2× Platinum	30,000^{*}
Spain (Promusicae)	Gold	30,000^{‡}
United Kingdom (BPI)	2× Platinum	1,200,000^{‡}
United States (RIAA)	2× Platinum	2,000,000^{‡}
Streaming
Denmark (IFPI Danmark)	Gold	900,000^{†}
^{*} Sales figures based on certification alone.^{‡} Sales+streaming figures based on certification alone.^{†} Streaming-only figures based on certification alone.

== Release history ==
Region	Date	Format	Label
United Kingdom	21 November 2012	CD; digital download	Warner

== See also ==
- List of best-selling singles in Australia
