= Taylor Swift videography =

Videos and films by American singer-songwriter

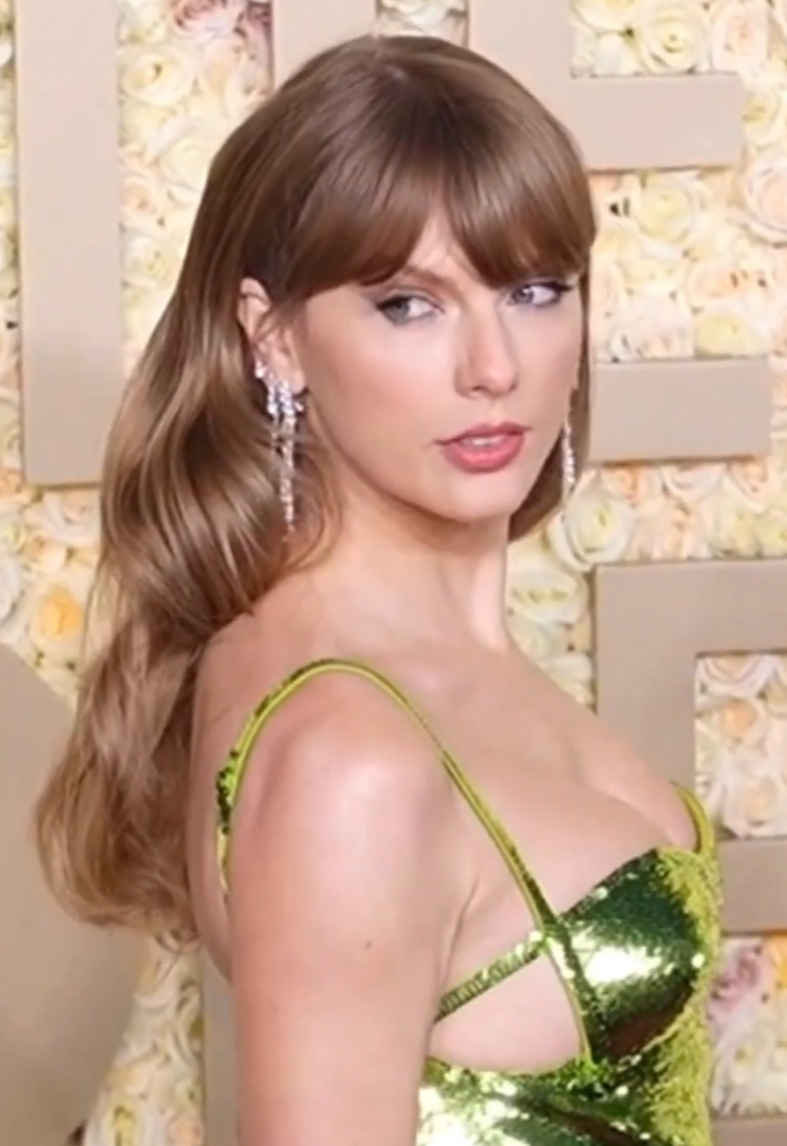
Swift at the 2024 Golden Globes

The American singer-songwriter Taylor Swift has appeared in various visual media. She has starred in 62 music videos, 16 of which she directed; released six documentaries, including four feature-length concert films; and acted in a number of fictional films, television shows, and commercial advertisements.

Trey Fanjoy directed several of Swift's award-winning music videos during her early career from 2006 to 2009. The music video for "Our Song" won Video of the Year at the 2008 CMT Music Awards. Swift's second studio album, Fearless (2008), was supported by the music videos for "Love Story" and "You Belong with Me". In 2009, the former won Video of the Year at both the CMT Music Awards and the Country Music Association Awards, and the latter won Best Female Video at the MTV Video Music Awards. Swift's first self-directed music video was for her 2010 album Speak Now's lead single, "Mine", which she directed with Roman White.

Swift's fourth studio album, Red (2012), was supported by the Anthony Mandler-directed music video for "I Knew You Were Trouble", which won Best Female Video at the 2013 MTV Video Music Awards. Joseph Kahn directed award-winning music videos for singles from Swift's fifth studio album, 1989 (2014). At the 2015 MTV Video Music Awards, "Blank Space" and "Bad Blood" featuring rapper Kendrick Lamar won four awards, including Video of the Year for the latter. "Bad Blood" also won the Grammy Award for Best Music Video. Kahn further directed the music video for singles from Swift's sixth studio album Reputation (2017), including for the lead single "Look What You Made Me Do", which broke several online viewing records.

With the music videos for singles from her seventh studio album Lover (2019), Swift began directing the majority of her work. At the MTV Video Music Awards, she won her second Video of the Year with "You Need to Calm Down" in 2019, and Best Direction with her solo directorial debut, "The Man", in 2020. She wrote and directed the short film All Too Well: The Short Film (2021), her debut as a filmmaker, and the music video for the lead single from her tenth studio album Midnights, "Anti-Hero" (2022). Both helped Swift win record-breaking third and fourth MTV Video Music Awards for Video of the Year in 2022 and 2023. Her other self-directed music videos were for singles including "Cardigan", "Willow", "Lavender Haze", "Karma", "Fortnight", "I Can Do It with a Broken Heart", "The Fate of Ophelia", and "Opalite" in 2020–2026.

Swift has released the live/video albums Taylor Swift and Def Leppard (2009), Speak Now World Tour – Live (2011), and Journey to Fearless (2011), and the documentary films/specials The 1989 World Tour Live (2015), Reputation Stadium Tour (2018), Miss Americana (2020), City of Lover (2020), Folklore: The Long Pond Studio Sessions (2020), and Taylor Swift: The Eras Tour (2023), which broke several box office records and became the highest-grossing concert film of all time. She has hosted Saturday Night Live in 2009, and played guest roles in the television shows CSI: Crime Scene Investigation in 2009 and New Girl in 2013. She has starred in films with ensemble casts, playing Felicia Miller in the romantic comedy Valentine's Day (2010), Bombalurina in the musical fantasy Cats (2019), and Liz Meekins in the comedy-thriller Amsterdam (2022), and provided her voice in the animated film The Lorax (2012).

== Music videos ==
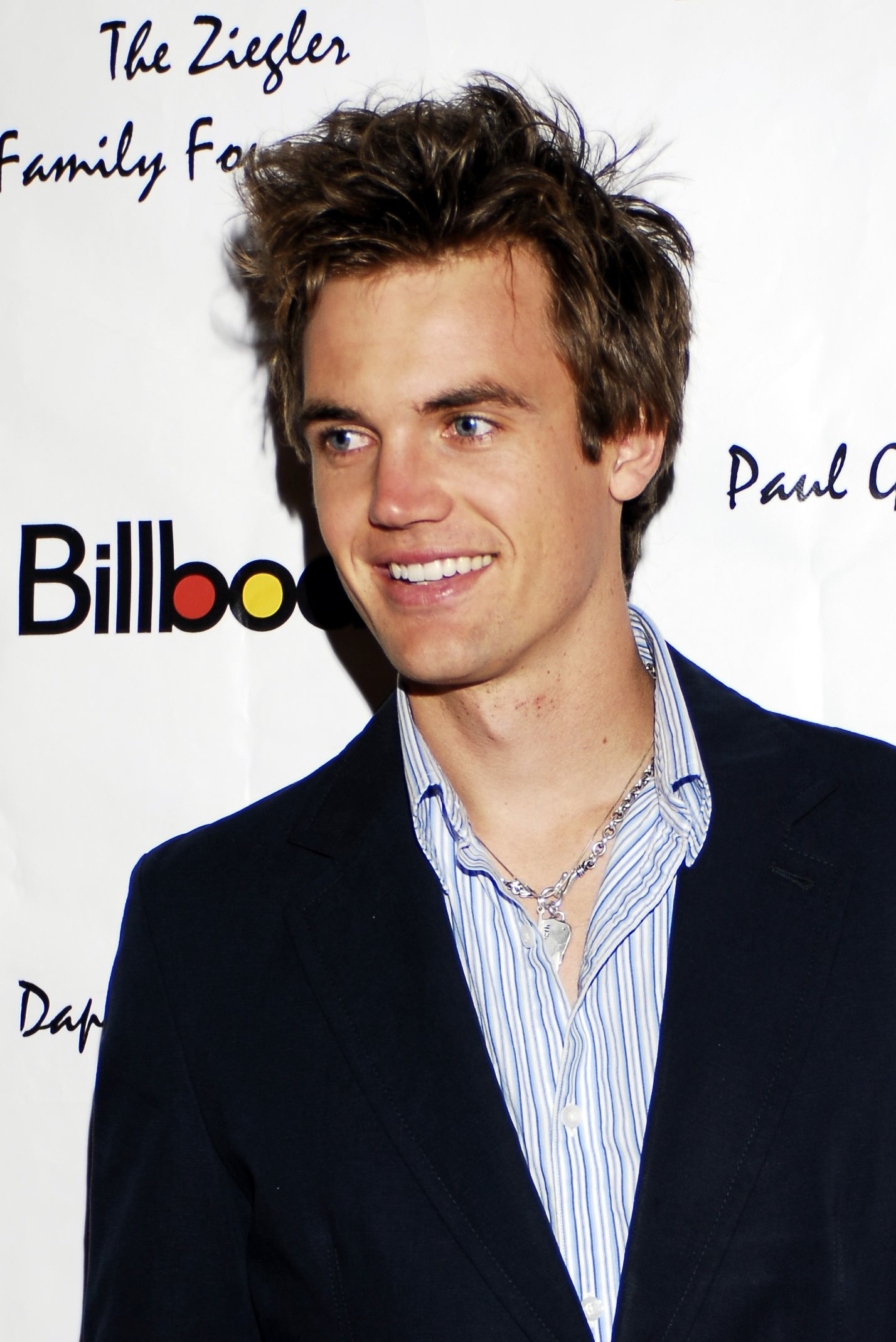
Tyler Hilton appears as Swift's love interest in "Teardrops on My Guitar".

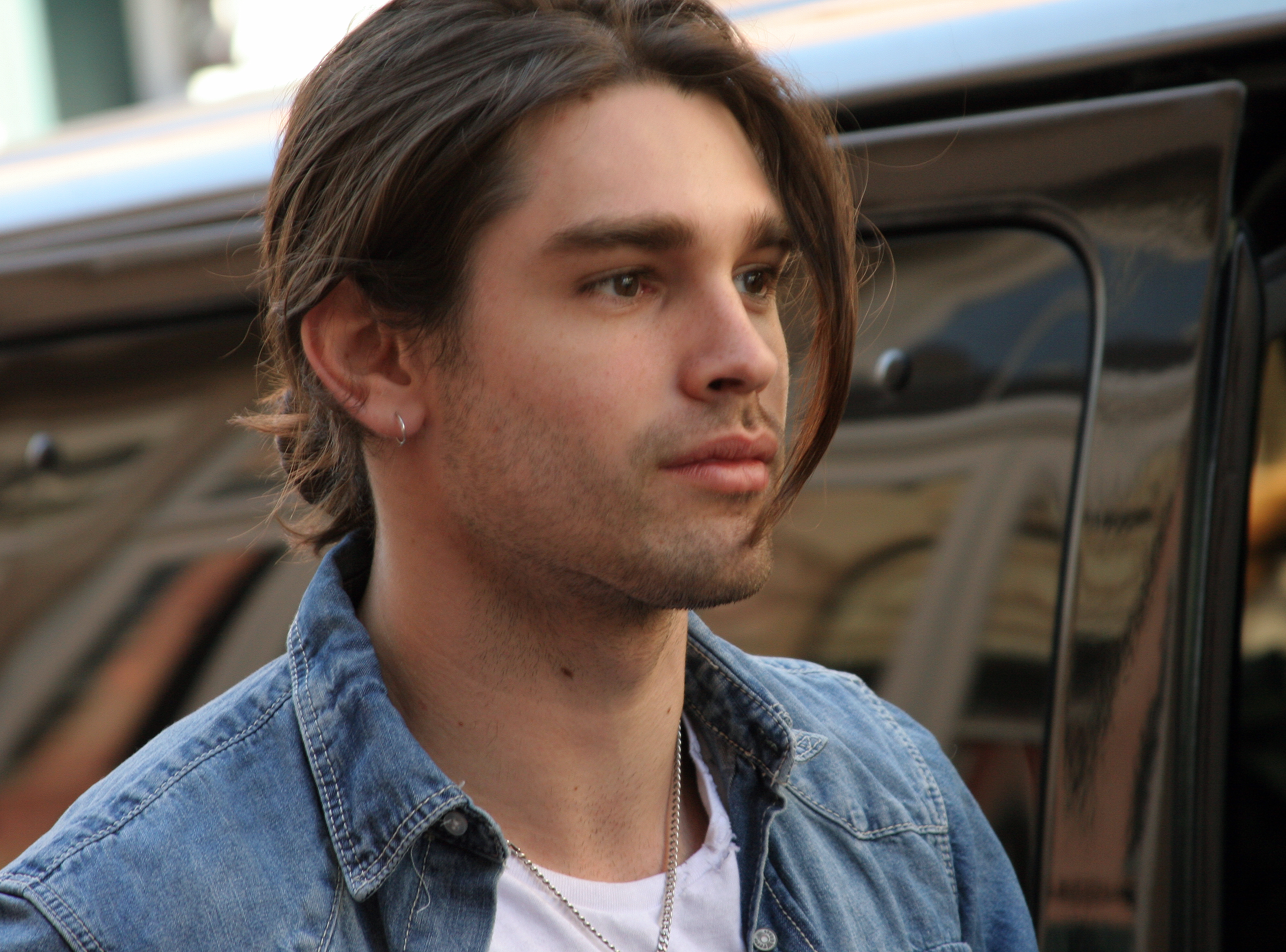
Justin Gaston plays the fictional character Romeo in "Love Story".

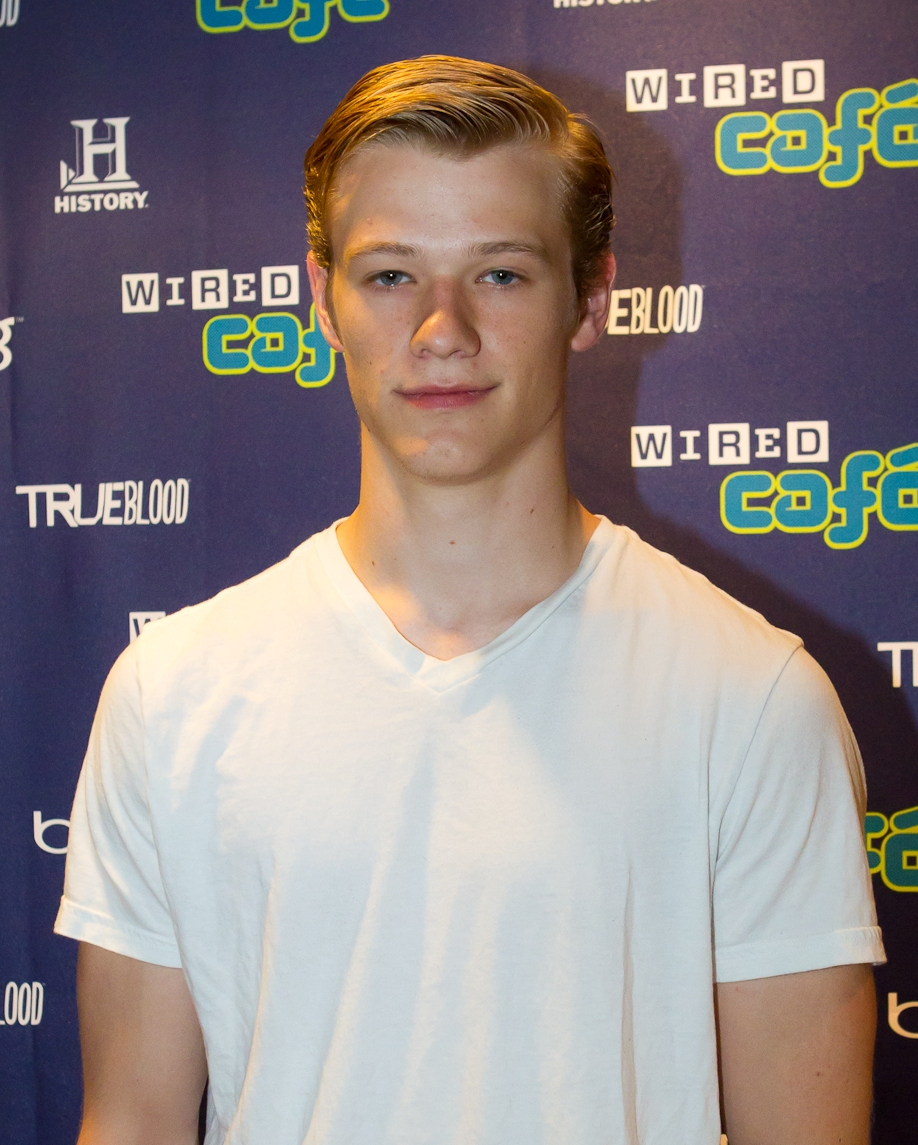
Lucas Till portrays the male lead in "You Belong With Me".

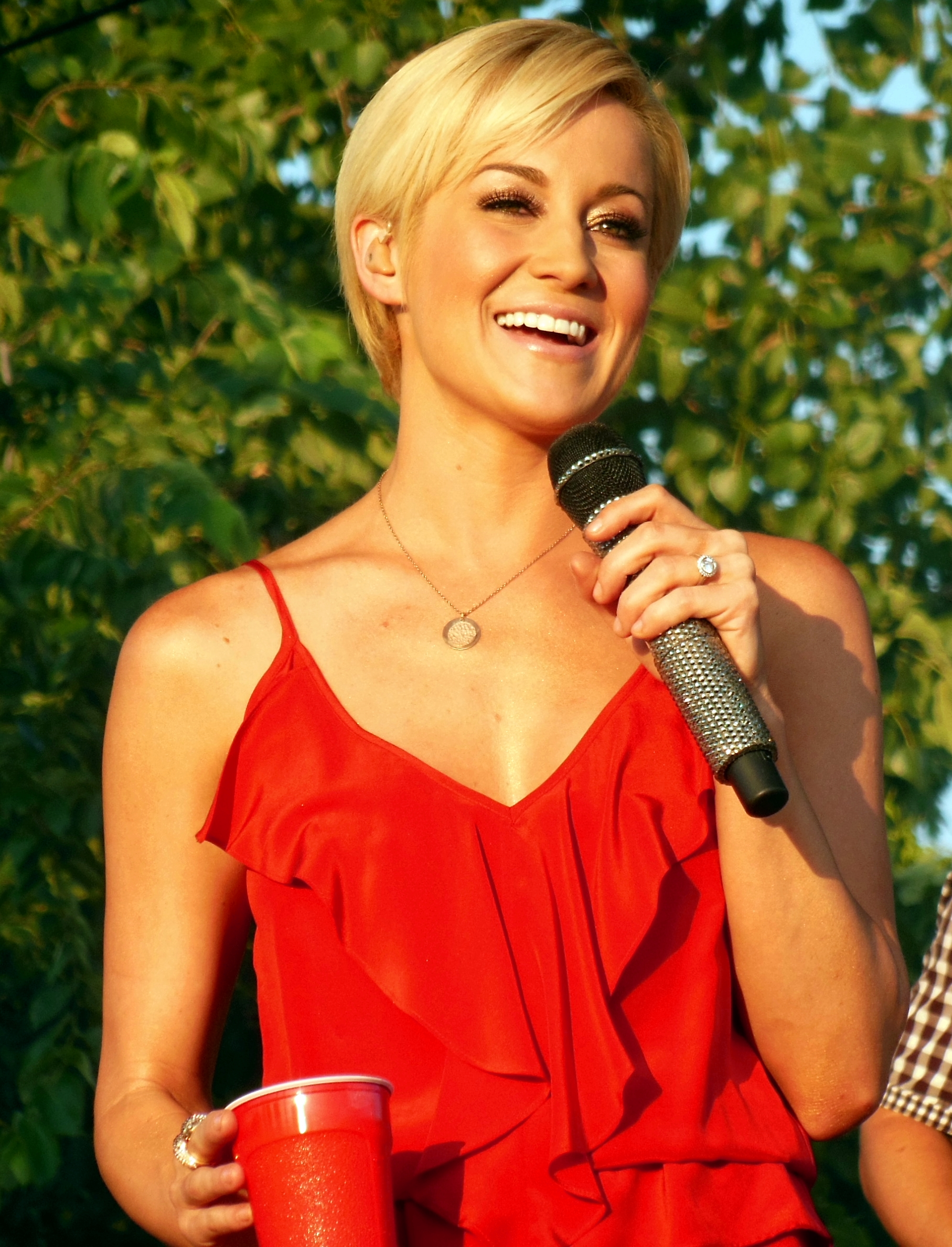
Swift appears in the video for Kellie Pickler's "Best Days of Your Life".

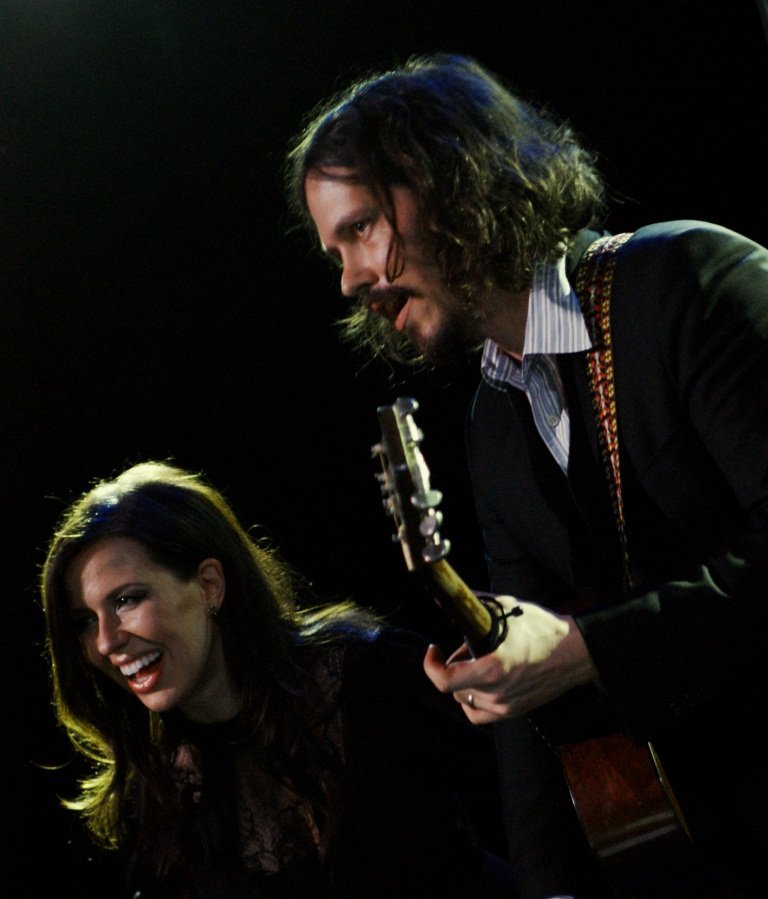
The Civil Wars appear in "Safe & Sound".

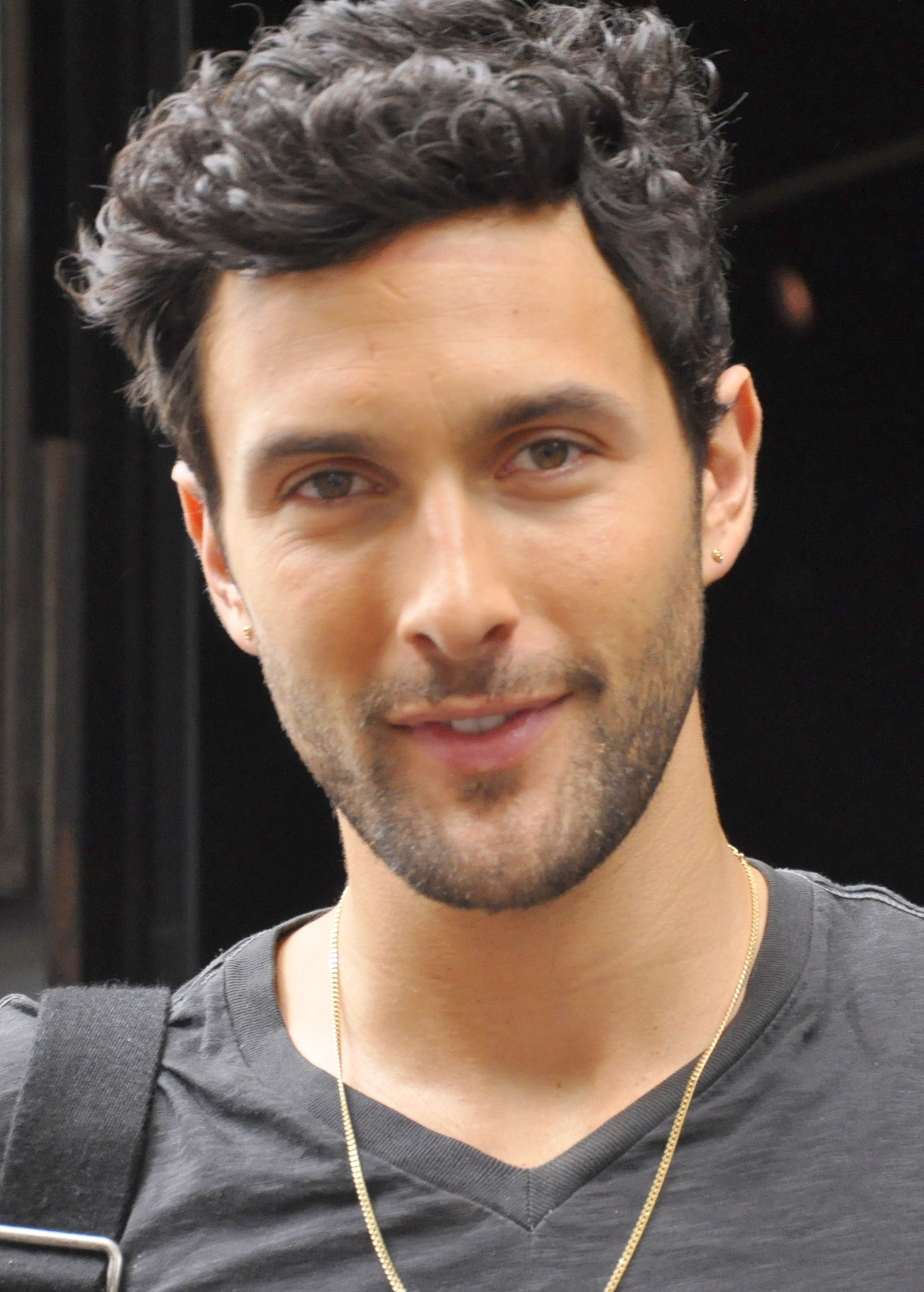
Noah Mills is seen in an on-again, off-again relationship with Swift in "We Are Never Ever Getting Back Together".

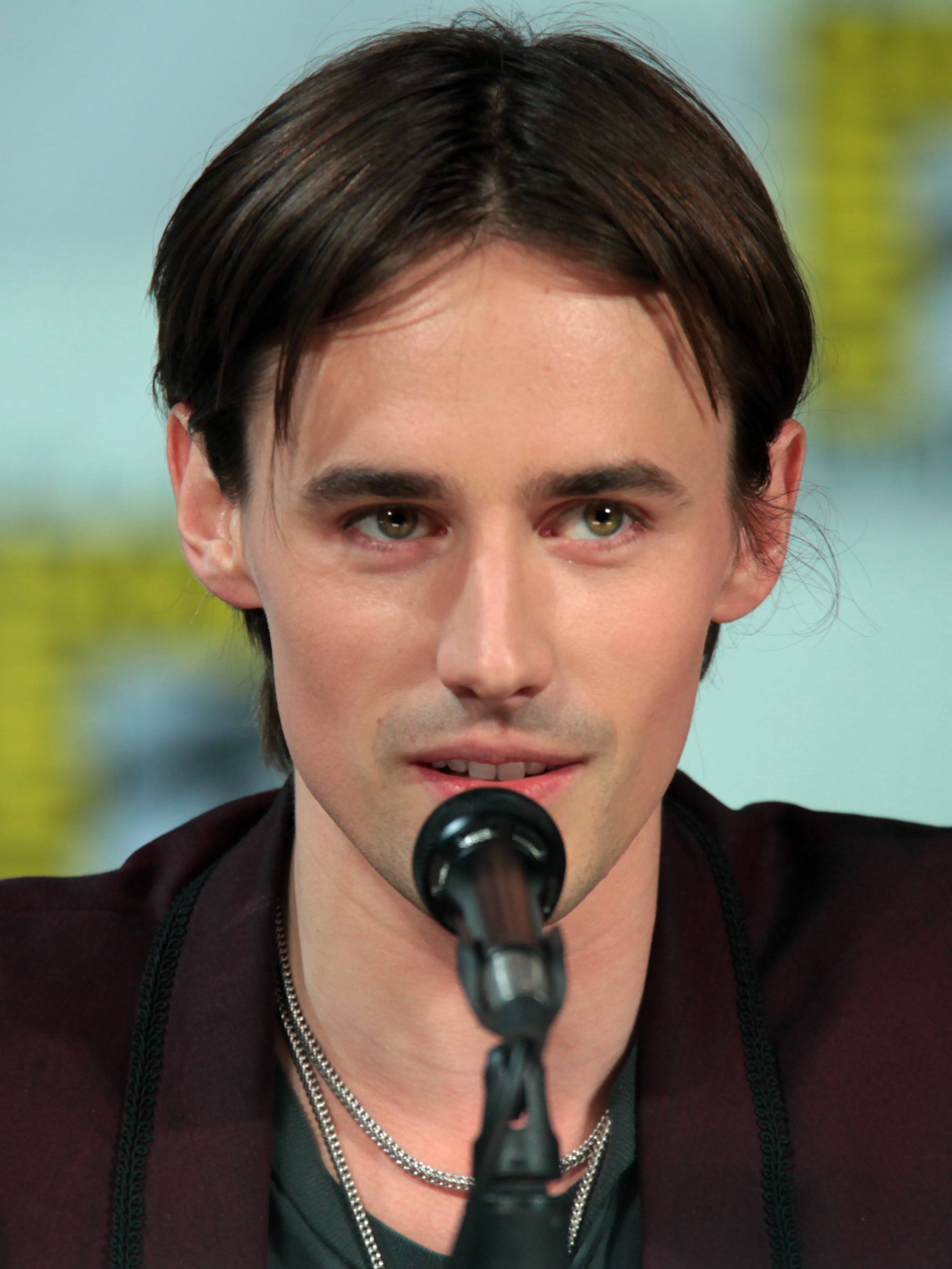
Reeve Carney plays Swift's boyfriend in "I Knew You Were Trouble".

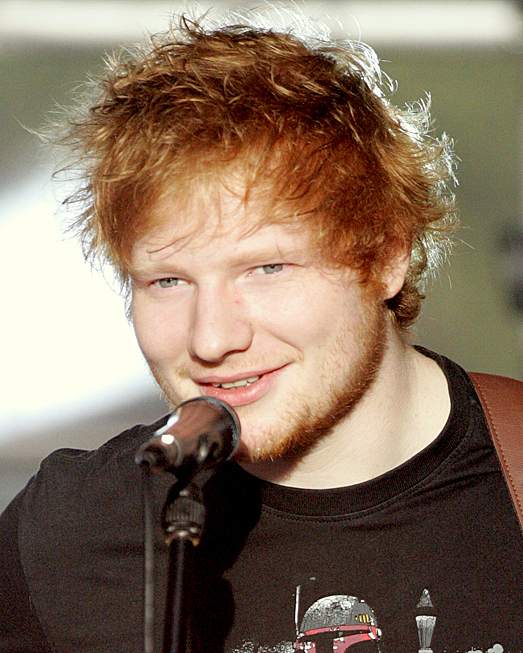
Ed Sheeran appears in the videos for "Everything Has Changed" and "End Game".

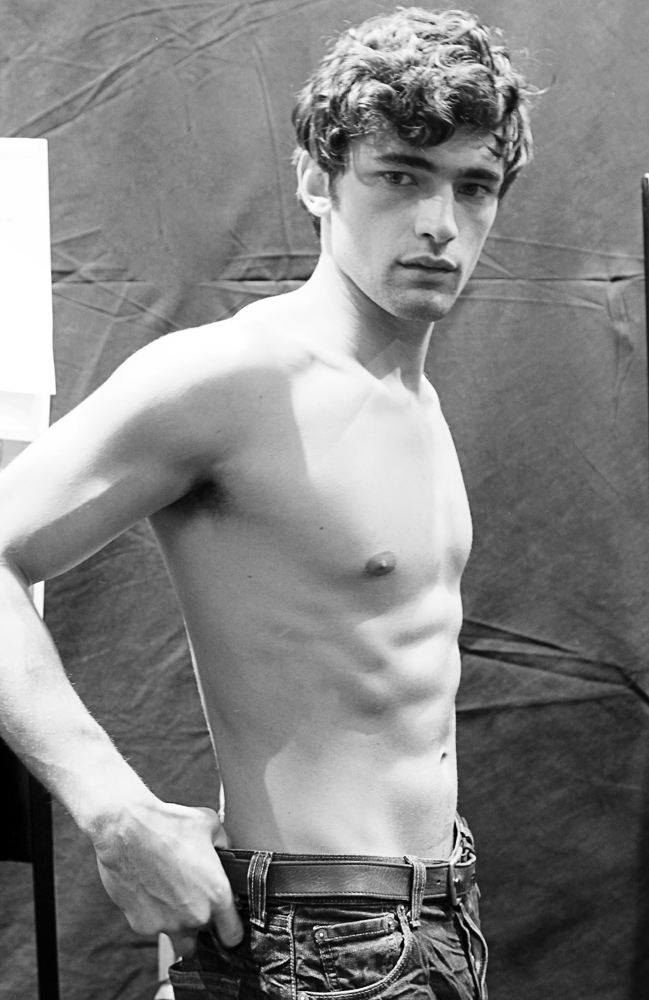
Sean O'Pry plays Swift's love interest in "Blank Space".

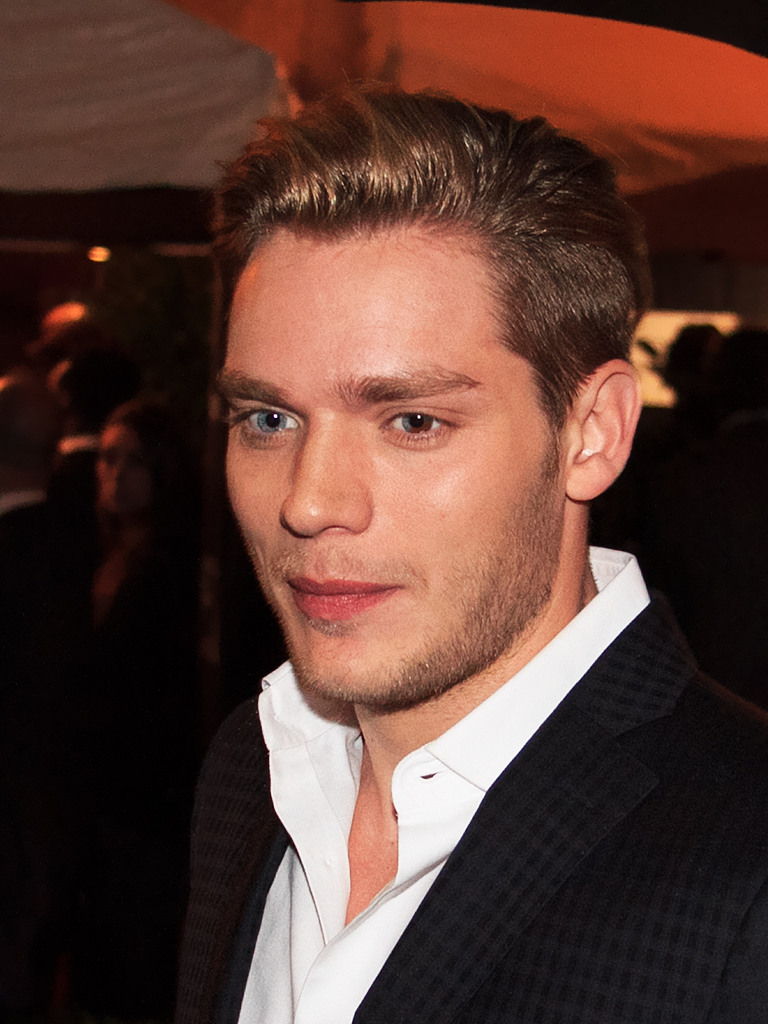
Dominic Sherwood plays Swift's love interest in "Style".

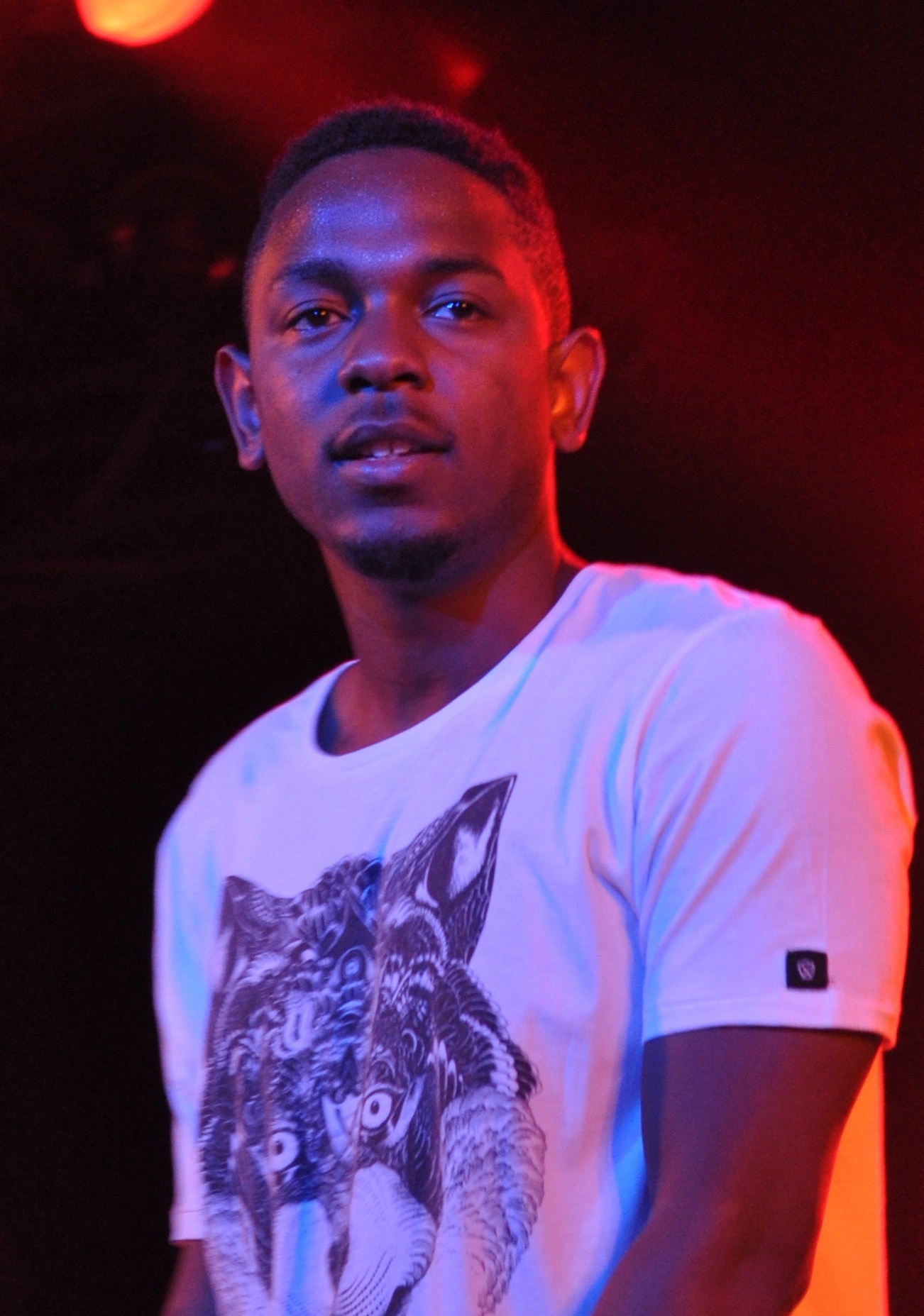
Kendrick Lamar plays the role of Welvin da Great in "Bad Blood", which featured an ensemble cast.

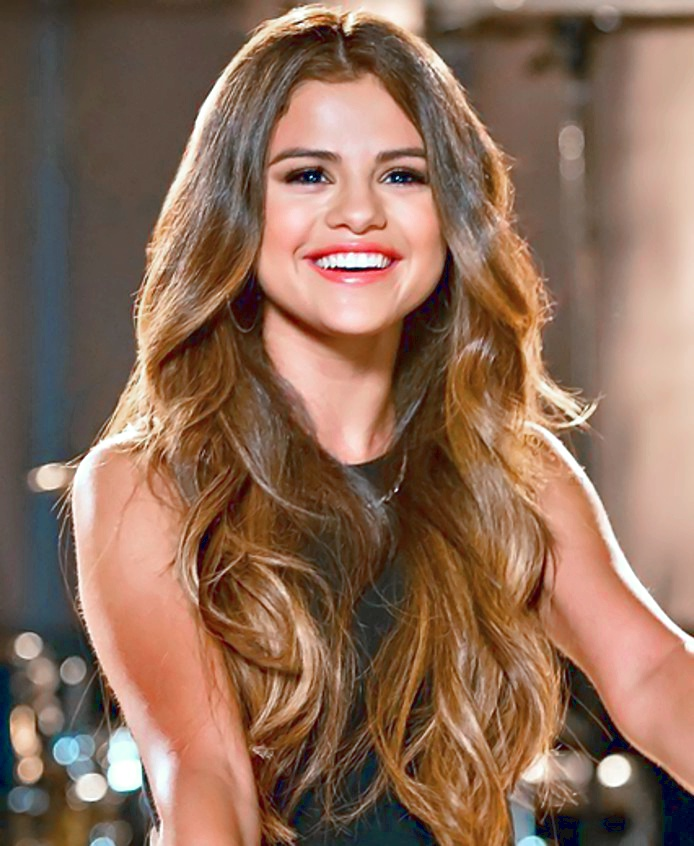
Selena Gomez played Swift's antagonist Arsyn in "Bad Blood".

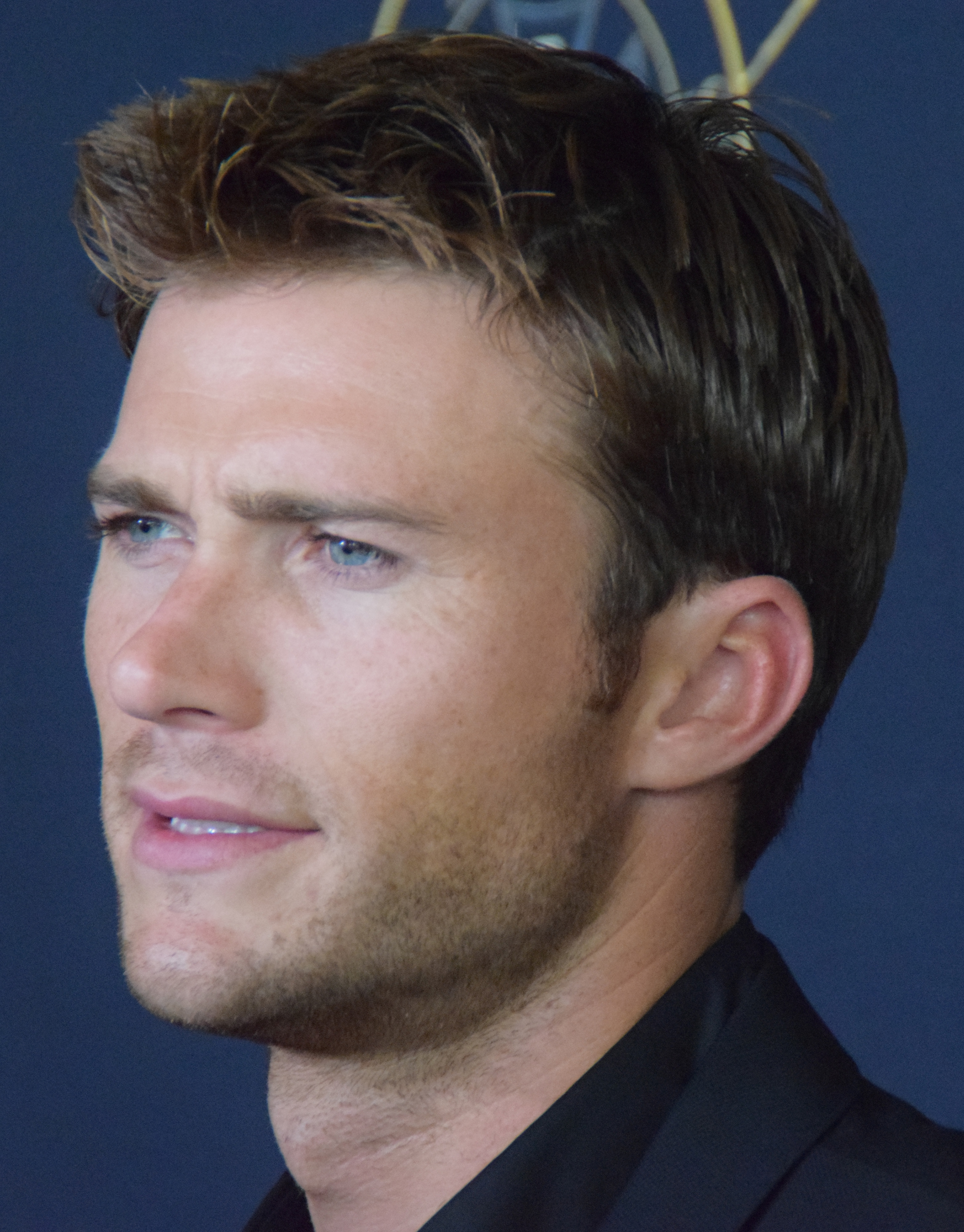
Scott Eastwood played the role of Robert Kingsley, Swift's love interest in "Wildest Dreams".

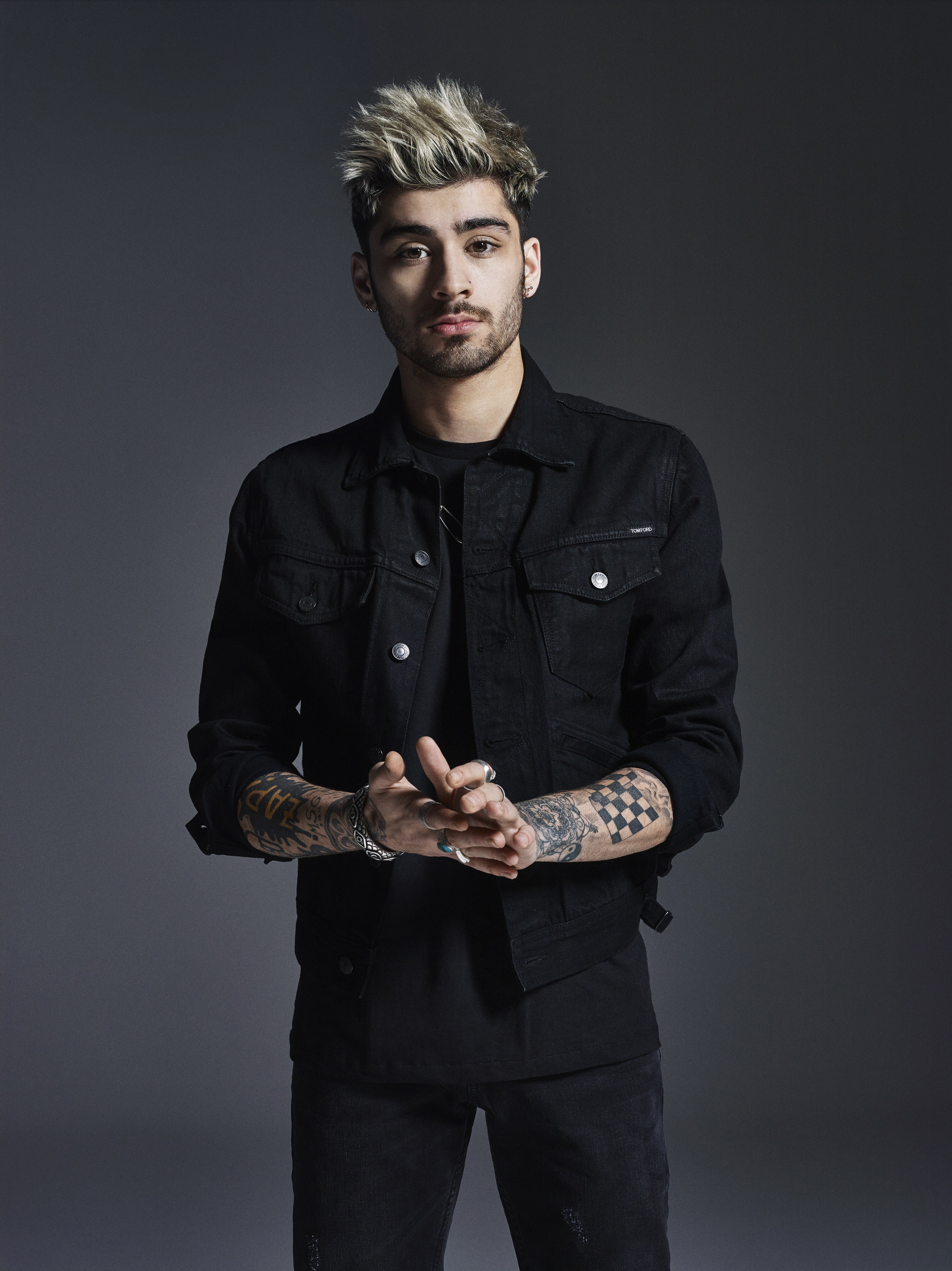
Zayn Malik starred in "I Don't Wanna Live Forever".

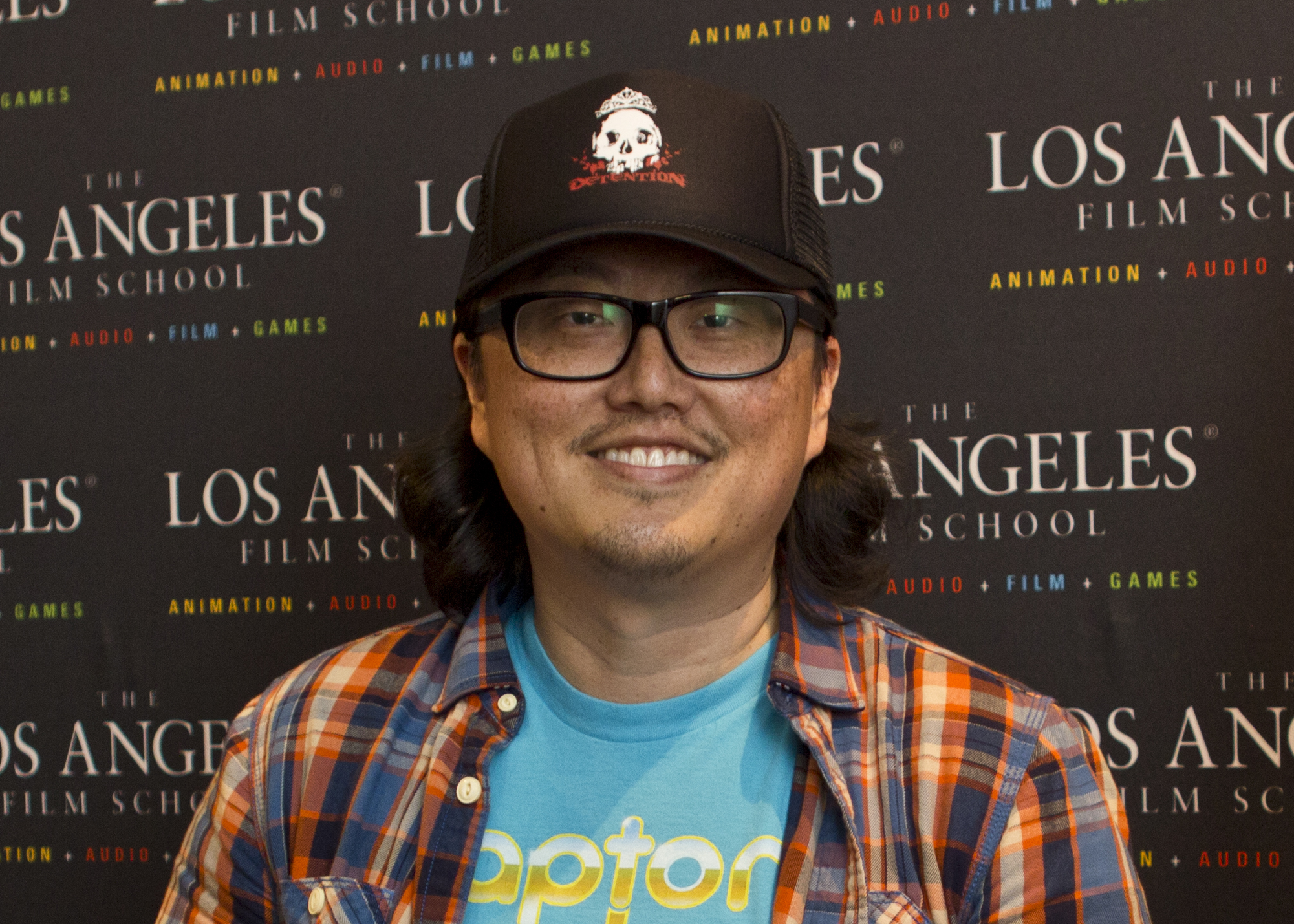
Joseph Kahn has directed eight of Swift's videos.

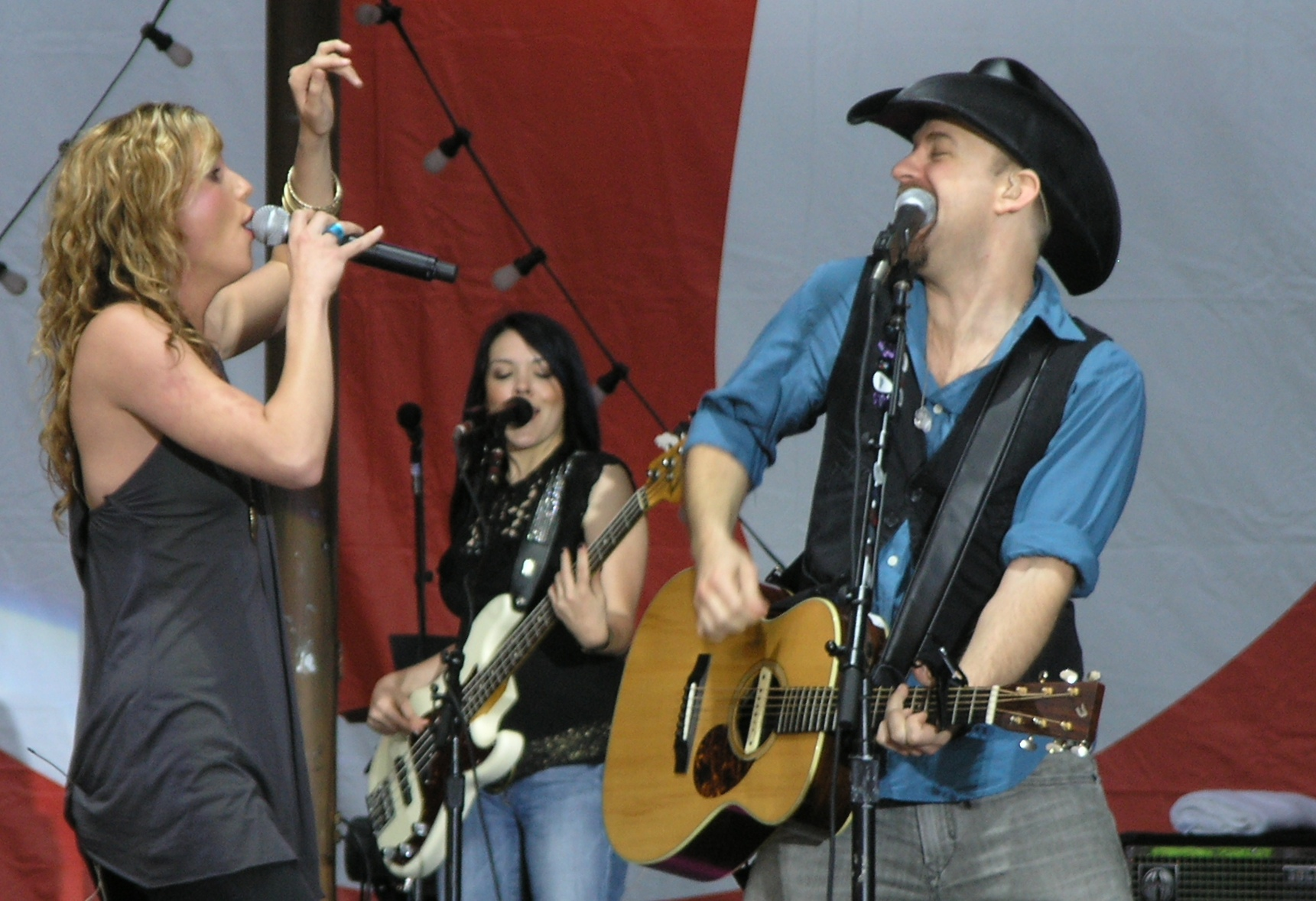
Swift collaborated with Sugarland on the music video for "Babe".

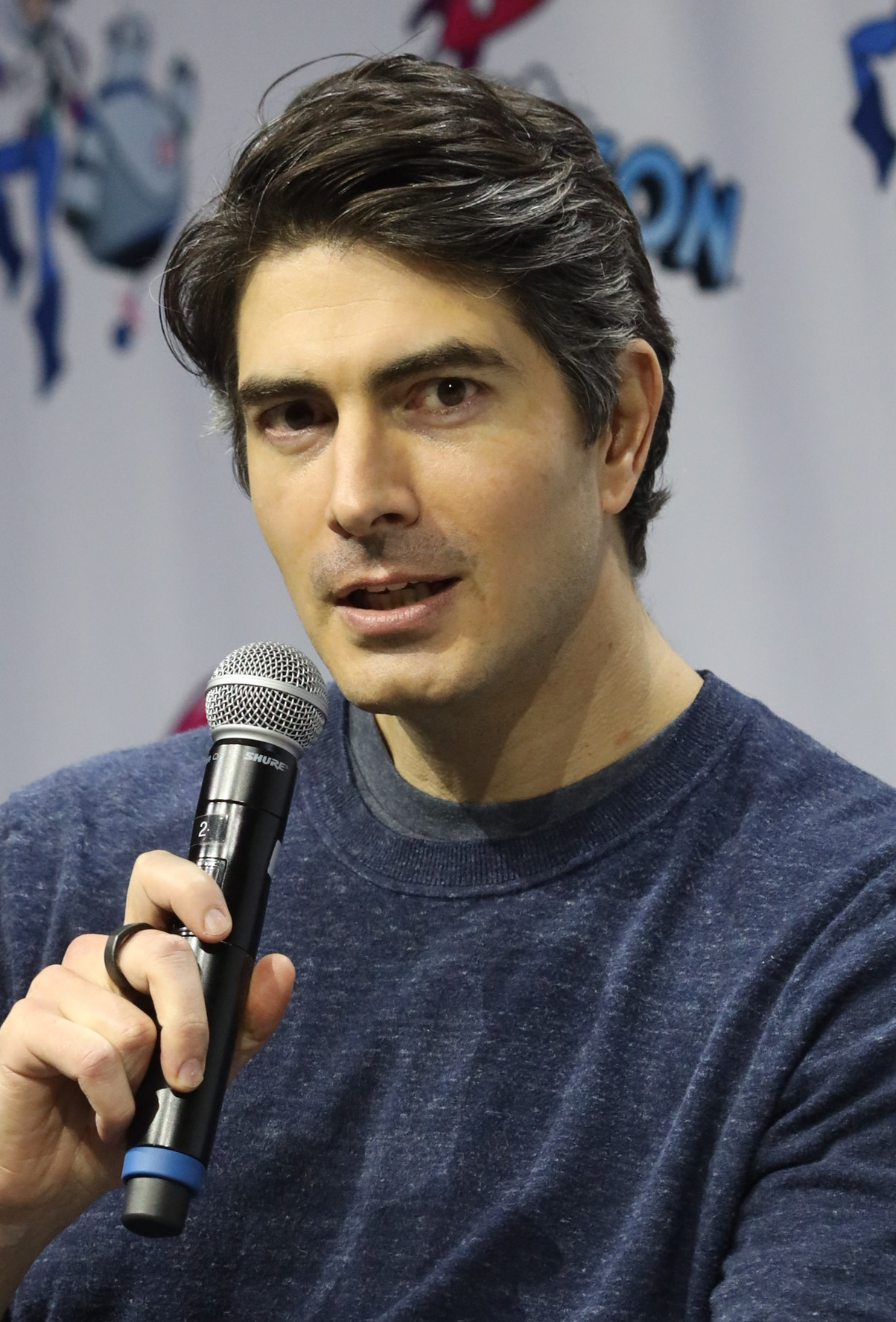
Brandon Routh plays Nettles's husband and Swift's love interest in "Babe".

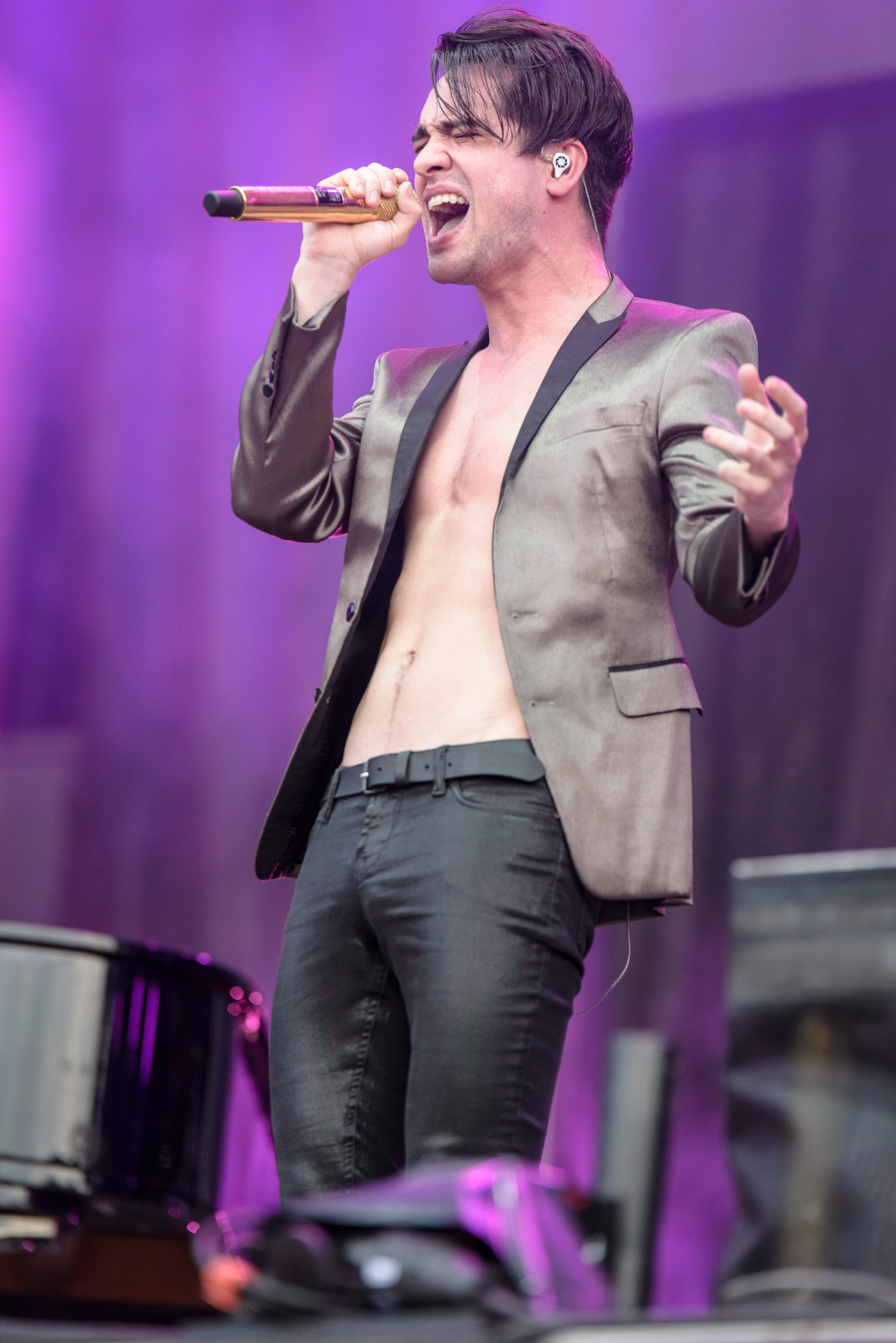
Brendon Urie starred alongside Swift in "Me!".

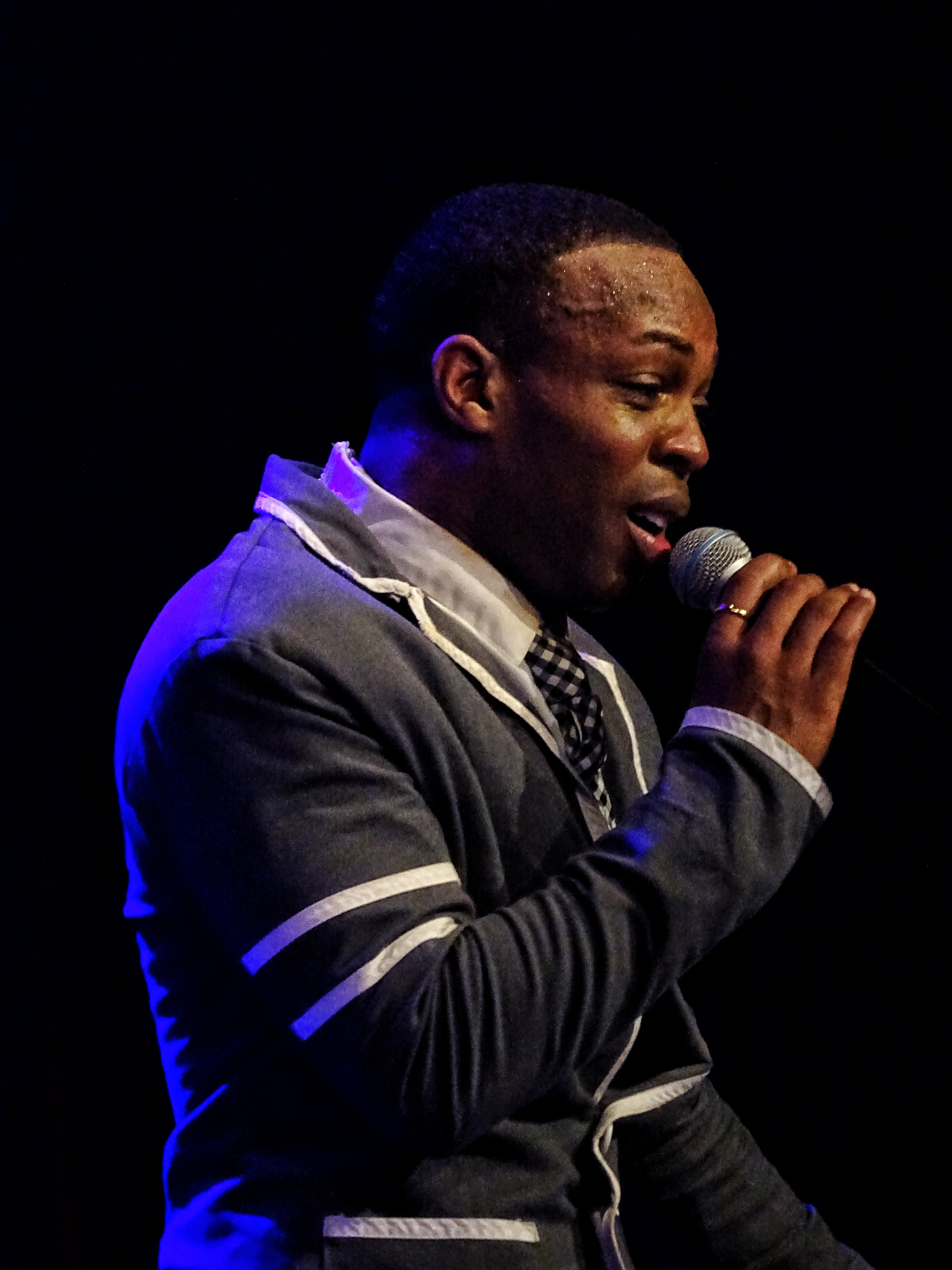
Todrick Hall was an executive producer of "You Need to Calm Down".

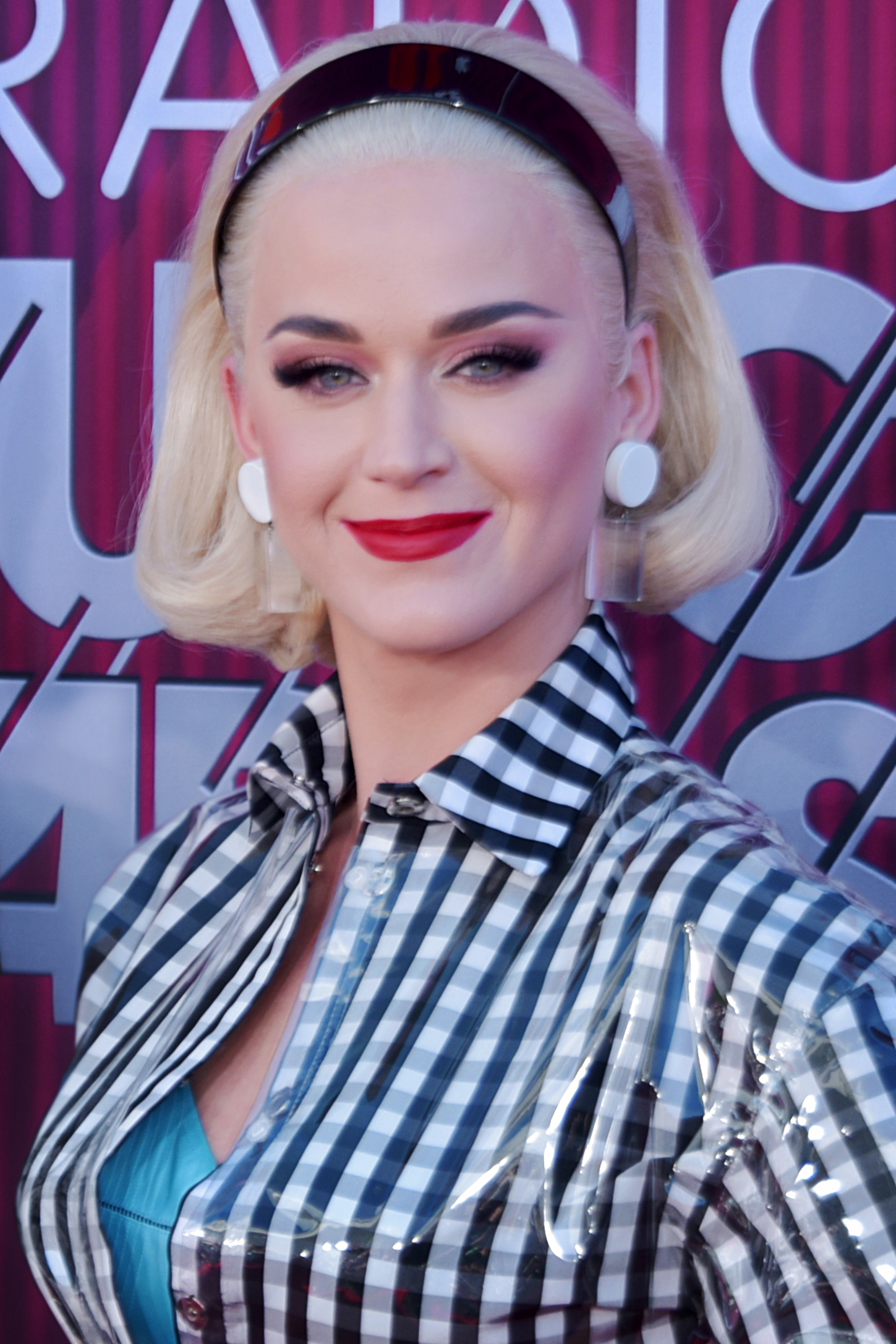
Katy Perry is one of many celebrities who starred in "You Need to Calm Down".

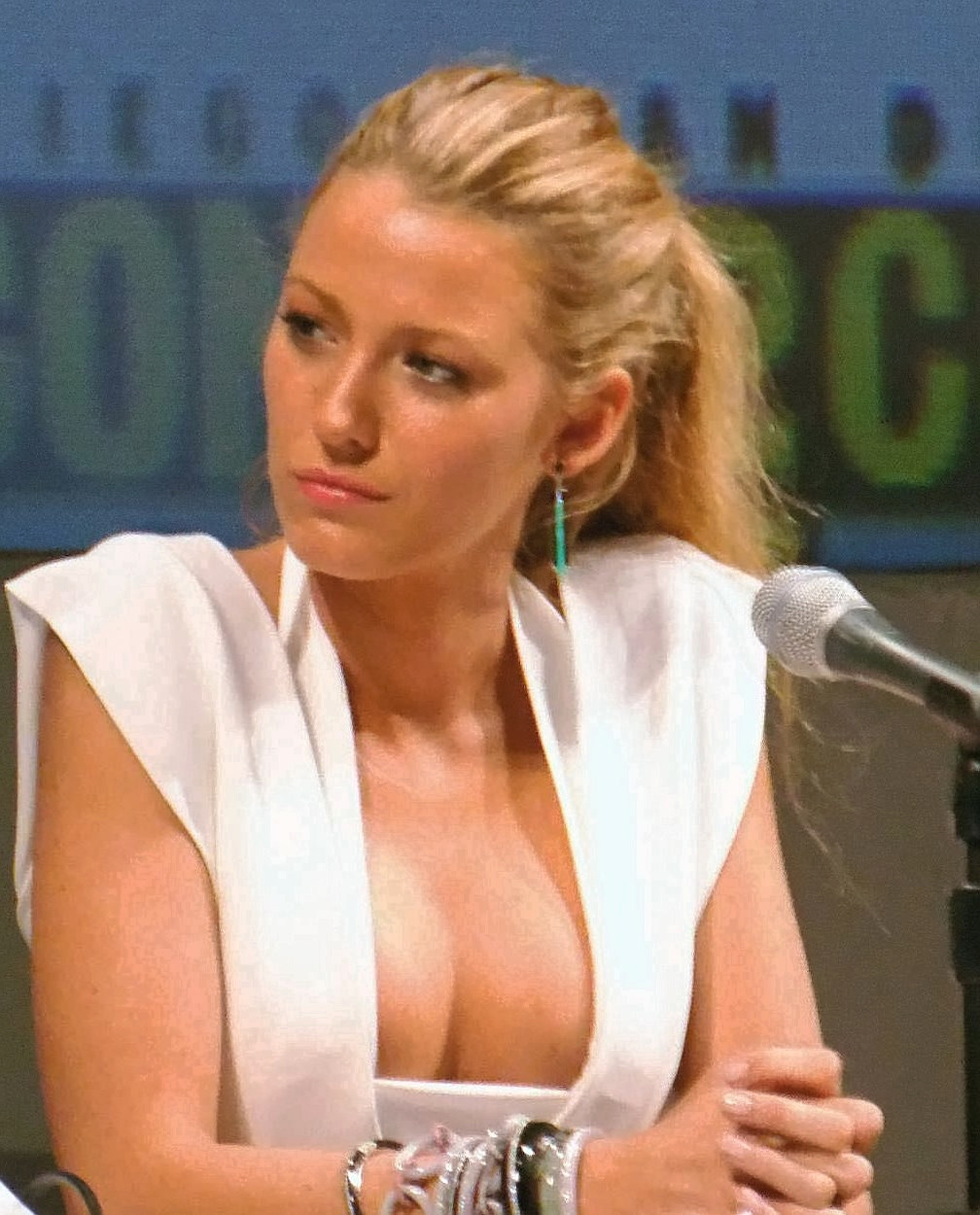
Blake Lively directed "I Bet You Think About Me" in her directorial debut.

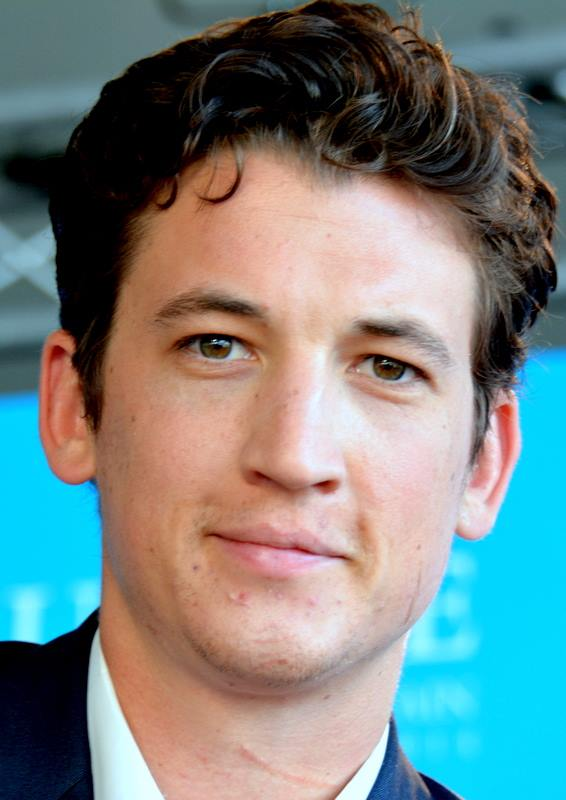
Miles Teller plays a groom in "I Bet You Think About Me".

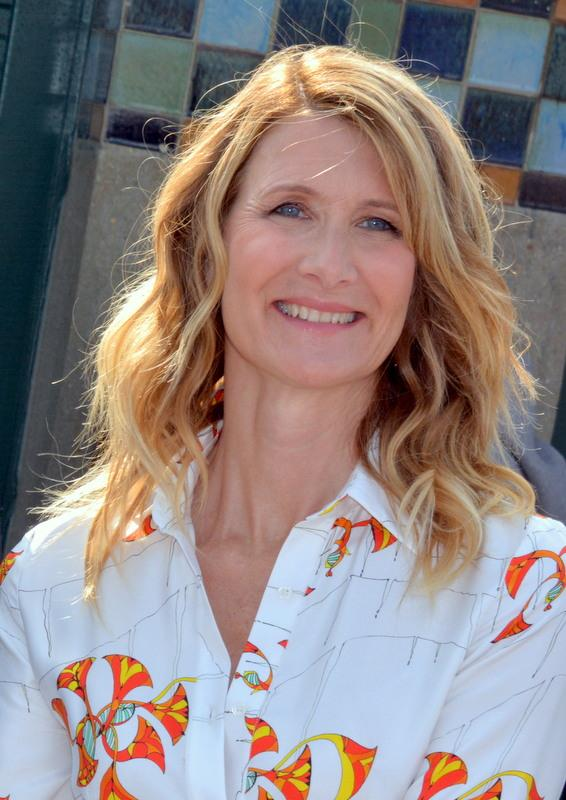
Laura Dern stars as Swift's cruel stepmother in the Cinderella reimagination "Bejeweled".

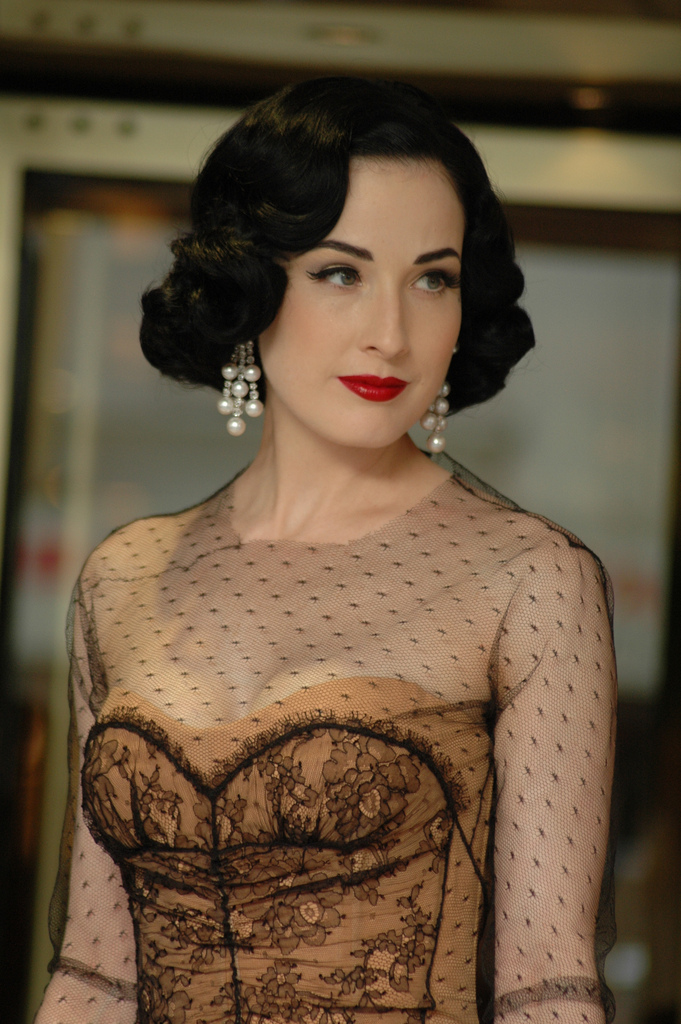
Dita Von Teese is Swift's "fairy godmother" in "Bejeweled".

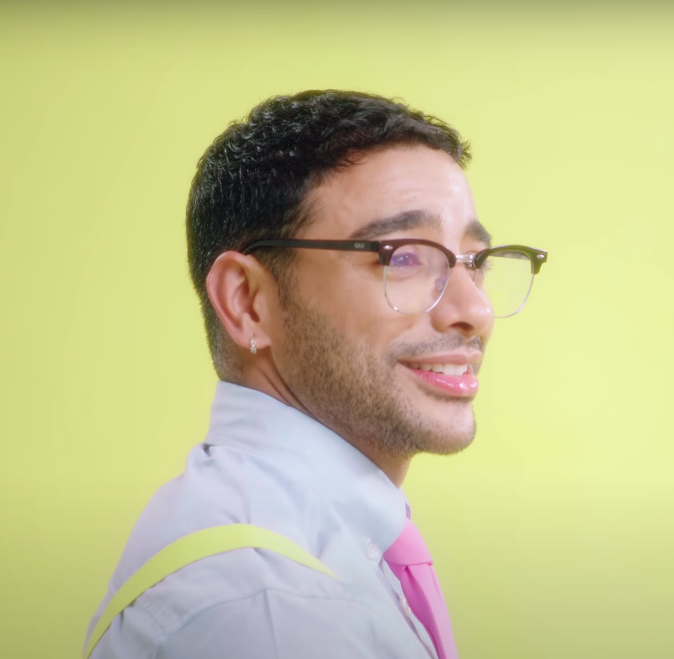
Laith Ashley appears in "Lavender Haze" as Swift's love interest.

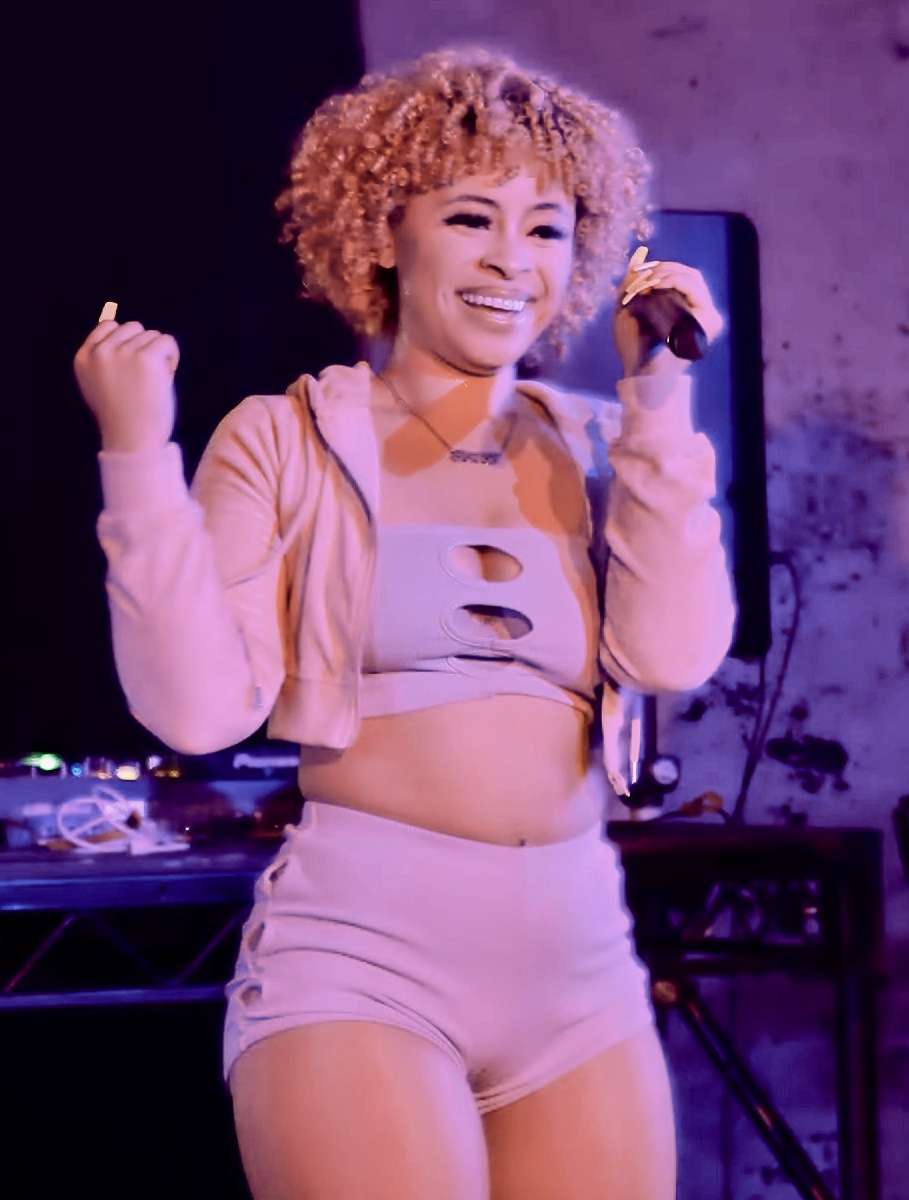
Ice Spice appears as a cosmic entity in "Karma".

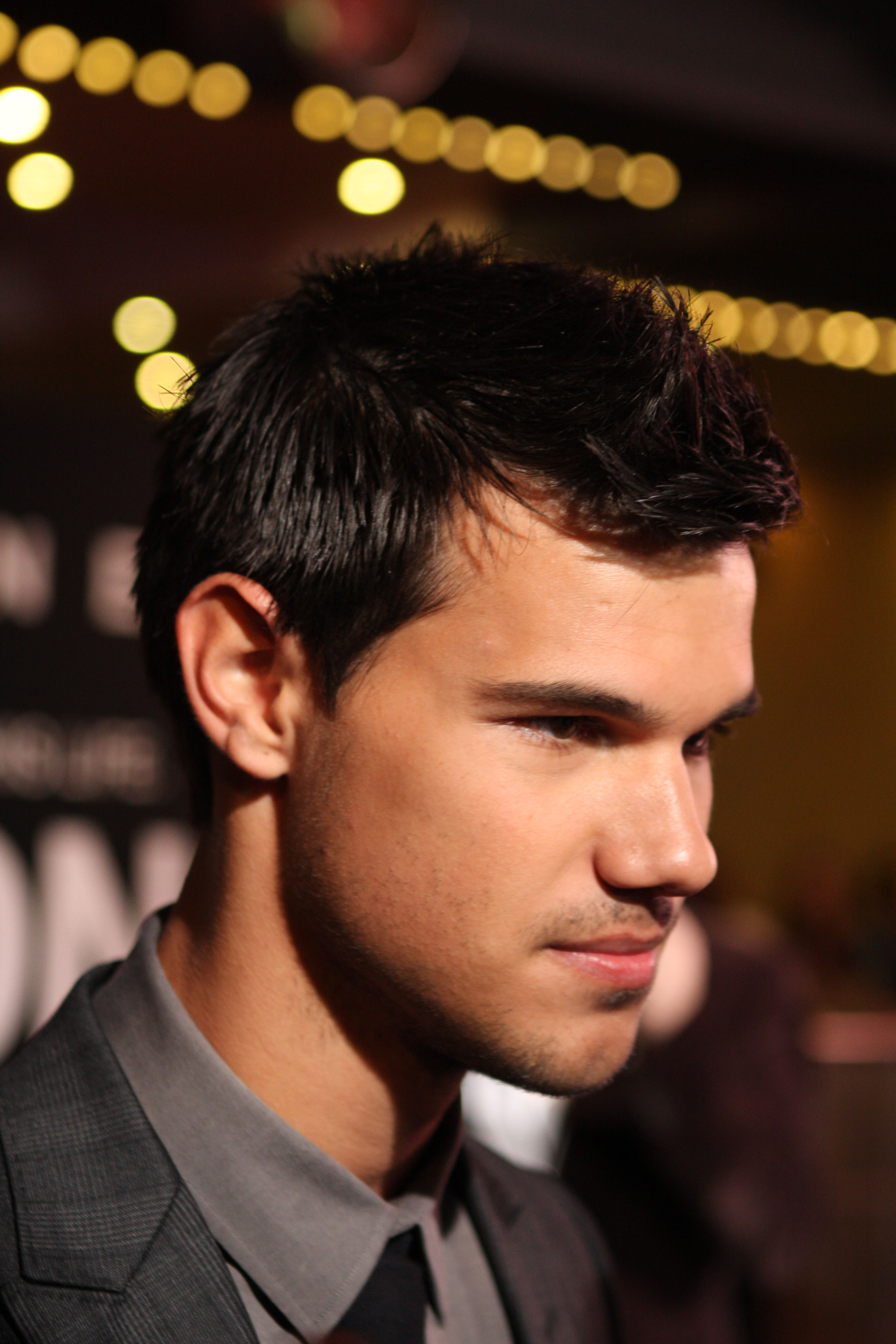
Taylor Lautner starred with Swift in the 2010 rom-com film Valentine's Day and appeared in "I Can See You".

Post Malone is featured on Swift's Fortnight (2024) and played her love interest in the video.

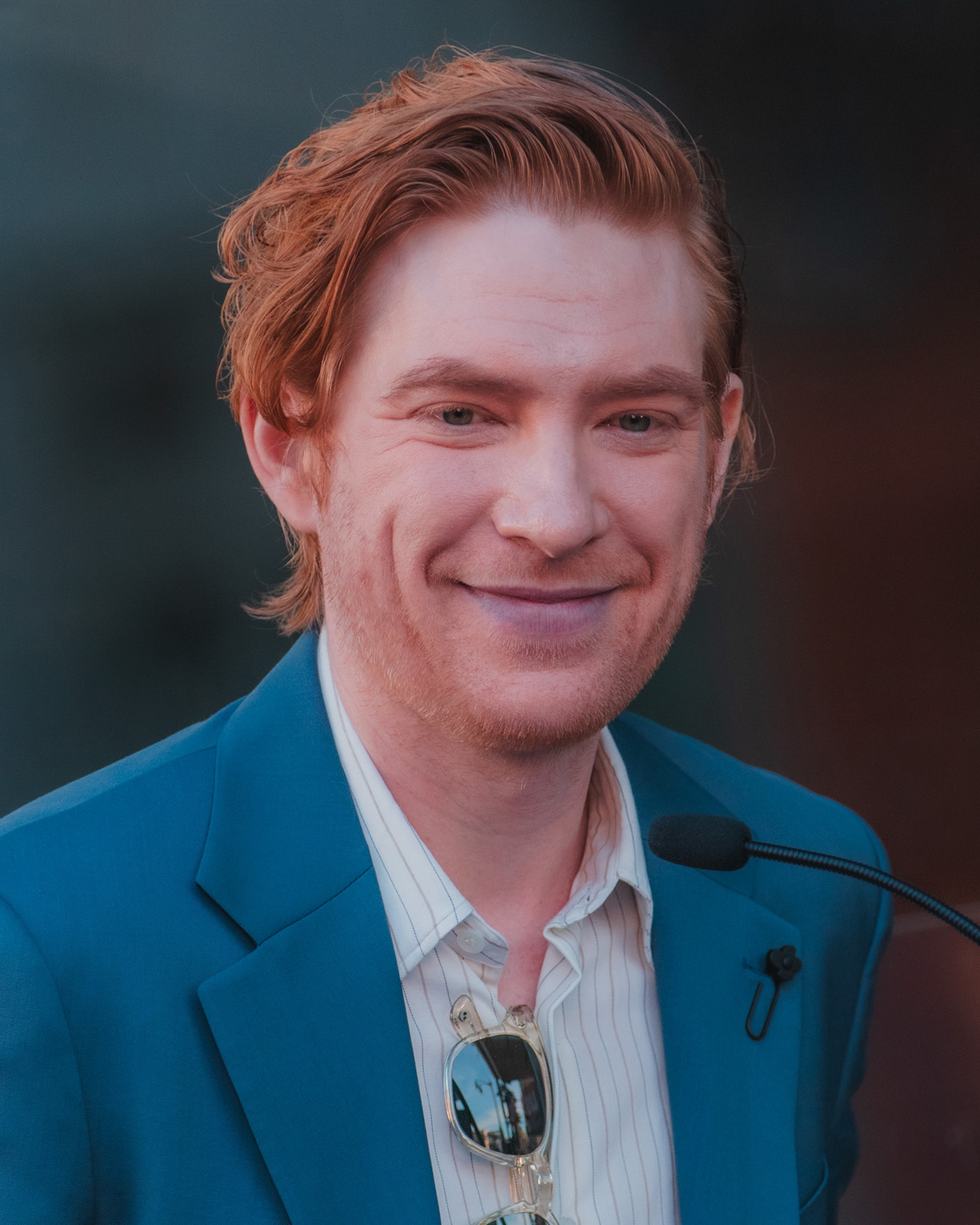
Domhnall Gleeson appears in "Opalite" as Swift's love interest.

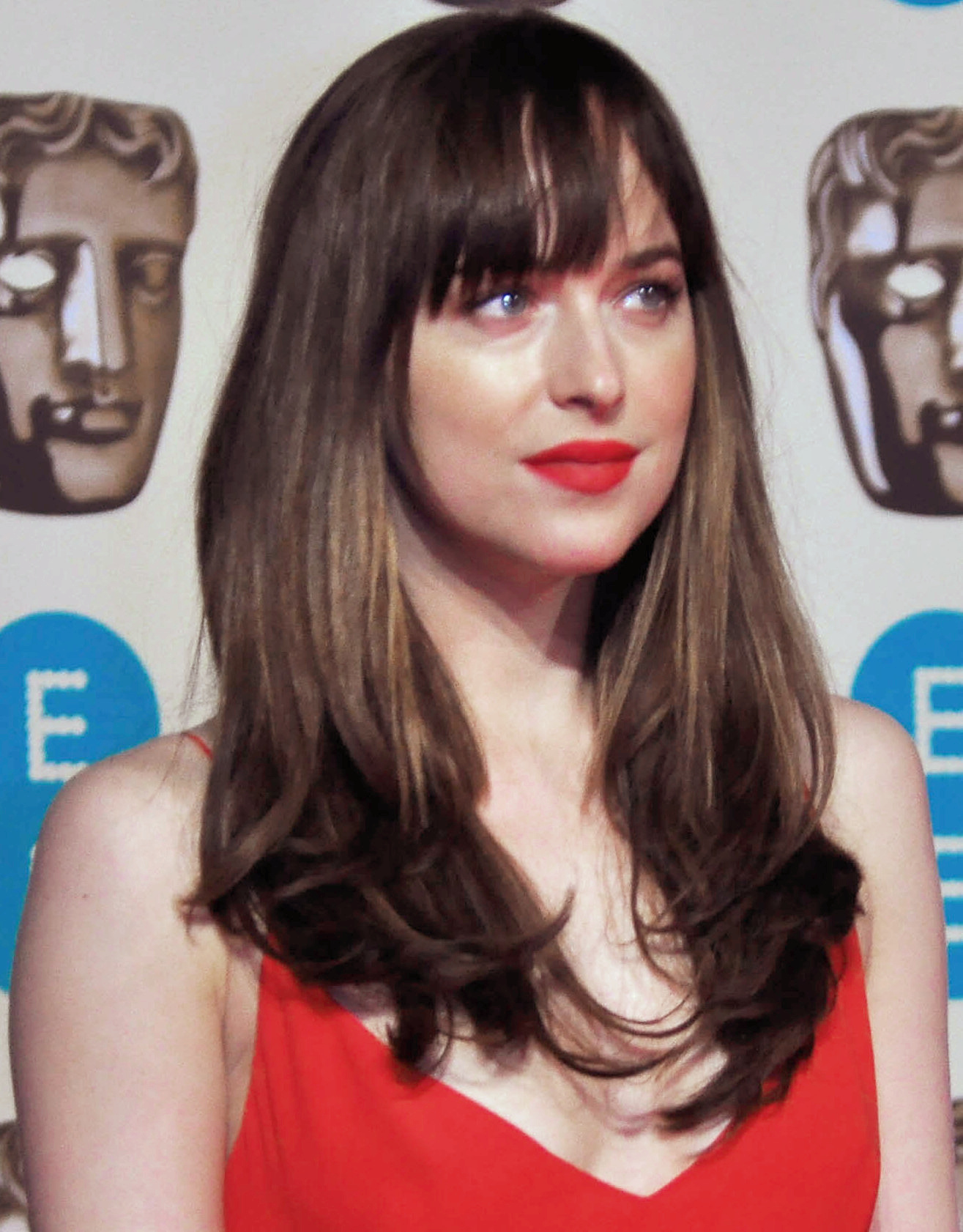
Dakota Johnson (pictured) starred opposite Colin Farrell in Swift's "Patient Zero" music video.

Key
•	Denotes music videos directed or co-directed by Taylor Swift

Title	Video release date	Other performer(s) credited	Director(s)	Description	Ref.
"Tim McGraw"	July 22, 2006	None	Trey Fanjoy	The video focuses on flashbacks by Swift's love interest, among cut scenes that feature Swift lying on a lake shore. The video received a nomination for Number One Streamed Video From a New Artist at the 2006 CMT Online Awards. At the 2007 CMT Music Awards, it won Breakthrough Video of the Year.	
"Teardrops on My Guitar"	February 20, 2007	None	Trey Fanjoy	Follows Swift's unrequited love for her friend who falls in love with another girl. The video received a nomination for Best New Artist at the 2008 MTV Video Music Awards.	
"Online"	July 2, 2007	Brad Paisley	Trey Fanjoy	Swift appears as a backup dancer in Brad Paisley's music video.	
"Our Song"	November 6, 2007	None	Trey Fanjoy	Swift is seen performing in various settings, including a front porch. At the 2008 CMT Music Awards, the video earned Video of the Year and Female Video of the Year.	
"I'm Only Me When I'm with You" •	February 12, 2008	None	Taylor Swift	The video showcases shots of her live concert footage.	
"Picture to Burn"	March 14, 2008	None	Trey Fanjoy	The video shows Swift fantasizing about exacting revenge on her ex-boyfriend as she sees him with another woman.	
"Beautiful Eyes"	June 15, 2008	None	Todd Cassetty; Trey Fanjoy	The video shows footage from Swift's eighteenth birthday party.	
"Should've Said No"	June 26, 2008	None	Louis J. Horvitz	The video shows Swift performing the song at the 2008 Academy of Country Music Awards.	
"Change"	August 8, 2008	None	Shawn Robbins	Swift performs with her band in a ballroom. An alternate version of the video features footage from the United States Olympic team at the 2008 Summer Olympics.	
"Love Story"	September 12, 2008	None	Trey Fanjoy	Inspired by William Shakespeare's tragedy Romeo and Juliet, the music video is a period piece focusing on Swift meeting a love interest in a current-day university campus while also remembering meeting each other and falling in love in a past life. The video replaces the original play's tragic conclusion with a happy ending. At the 2009 CMT Music Awards, the video won the awards for Video of the Year and Female Video of the Year.	
"White Horse"	February 7, 2009	None	Trey Fanjoy	An ex-boyfriend approaches Swift looking for a second chance. She recalls multiple memories with him, both positive and negative.	
"Best Days of Your Life"	March 27, 2009	Kellie Pickler	Roman White	When Pickler sees her boyfriend cheating on her, she leaves him. He finds his life miserable with his new girlfriend and misses being with Pickler instead.	
"Crazier"	March 28, 2009	None	Peter Chelsom	The video is taken from Taylor Swift's cameo performance in the film Hannah Montana: The Movie.	
"The Best Day" •	May 1, 2009	None	Taylor Swift	The video showcases home videos of Swift and her mother.	
"You Belong with Me"	May 4, 2009	None	Roman White	Swift, a studious girl, yearns for a popular boy next door. At the 2009 MTV Video Music Awards, the music video was named Best Female Video. Her acceptance speech was interrupted by the rapper Kanye West, which sparked controversy and received much media attention. With over one billion views, it is the most viewed country music video on YouTube.	
"Fifteen"	October 9, 2009	None	Roman White	The video was filmed using green screen with heavy usage of special effects. Swift walks through a garden, where she relives many school memories with her best friend.	
"Two Is Better Than One"	October 19, 2009	Boys Like Girls	Meiert Avis	Swift does not appear in the music video, but her vocals are still heard. The video shows the story of a couple's relationship while Boys Like Girls are shown performing in what appears to be an empty hangar.	
"Fearless"	February 17, 2010	None	Todd Cassetty	Director Todd Cassetty edited footage from the Fearless Tour performances and backstage for the video.	
"Half of My Heart"	June 1, 2010	John Mayer	P.R. Brown	An alternate edit of the song featuring Swift's vocals was set to the music video, though Swift herself does not appear in it.	
"Mine" •	August 27, 2010	None	Roman White	Swift recalls the fights between her parents that follow her through adulthood, her own relationship, and marriage.	
"Back to December"	January 13, 2011	None	Yoann Lemoine	Swift mourns her break-up with her ex-boyfriend whom she did not treat well when they were together.	
"Mean"	May 6, 2011	None	Declan Whitebloom	The video documents the lives of four different people being bullied in different stages and time settings. However, their lives get better in the end of the video.	
"The Story of Us"	May 20, 2011	None	Noble Jones	Swift is seen narrating the eponymous book in a college library. The scenes cut back and forth between her and her ex-boyfriend and students in the library.	
"Sparks Fly"	August 10, 2011	None	Christian Lamb	The video shows clips of various performances from the Speak Now World Tour.	
"Ours"	December 2, 2011	None	Declan Whitebloom	The video primarily takes place in an office where Swift works and watches various videos of her and her boyfriend. It ends with them embracing each other as he returns from the military.	
"Long Live"	January 30, 2012	Paula Fernandes	Eduardo Levy	The music video was filmed to appear as if Swift and Fernandes were performing the song at the same time while connected via satellite, with scenes featuring Fernandes filmed in Brazil, and scenes featuring Swift filmed at a show in the United States.	
"Safe & Sound"	February 13, 2012	The Civil Wars	Philip Andelman	The video features Swift walking barefoot through a gloomy forest while the Civil Wars are inside a cottage in front of a fireplace singing along to the song. The video contains multiple references to The Hunger Games, including Swift finding a mockingjay pin.	
"Both of Us"	June 27, 2012	B.o.B	Jake Nava	Along with B.o.B and Swift, the video shows people living their day-to-day lives.	
"We Are Never Ever Getting Back Together"	August 30, 2012	None	Declan Whitebloom	When her on-again, off-again boyfriend does awful things to her, Swift realizes that they are never ever getting back together.	
"Begin Again"	October 23, 2012	None	Philip Andelman	The video finds Swift roaming around the streets of Paris in search of a fresh start, which she finds in a new love interest.	
"I Knew You Were Trouble."	December 13, 2012	None	Anthony Mandler	Swift recounts the events of a passionate but destructive romance. The video won Best Female Video at the 2013 MTV Video Music Awards and was also nominated for Video of the Year.	
"22"	March 13, 2013	None	Anthony Mandler	Swift bounces on trampolines, plays on the beach and has a house party with her friends.	
"Highway Don't Care"	May 6, 2013	Tim McGraw; Keith Urban	Shane C. Drake	The video highlights the dangers of driving while distracted, particularly texting and driving. It sees an accident as a result of a similar situation.	
"Everything Has Changed"	June 6, 2013	Ed Sheeran	Philip Andelman	Two children, a girl resembling Swift and a boy resembling Sheeran, meet each other on a bus to elementary school and become friends. Throughout the video, they are seen painting their faces, pretending to be a princess and knight, and dancing with each other in the empty school gym.	
"Red"	July 4, 2013	None	Kenny Jackson	The video showcases footage from Swift's the Red Tour, with the audience cheering in the background.	
"The Last Time"	November 15, 2013	Gary Lightbody	Terry Richardson	Footage from the Red Tour performance in Sacramento, California in August 2013 was used to create the music video.	
"Shake It Off"	August 18, 2014	None	Mark Romanek	Swift appears dancing alongside other dancers in the styles of ballet, cheerleading, hip hop, jazz, lyrical and twerking. Throughout the video, Swift references several pop musicians, including Lady Gaga and Skrillex. With over 3.1 billion views, it is one of the most viewed YouTube videos and the third most viewed by a female artist.	
"Blank Space"	November 10, 2014	None	Joseph Kahn	The video features Swift with her love interest in a mansion. After learning of his betrayal, Swift turns into a man-eating psychotic jealous girlfriend. With over 3.7 billion views as of October 2025, it is her most viewed video on her channel surpassing Shake It Off. It received two MTV Video Music Awards—Best Female Video and Best Pop Video.	
"Style"	February 13, 2015	None	Kyle Newman	The video is different from Swift's previous work, featuring her in a darker, more abstract, light. The video is a recollection of memories of Swift's love interest amongst flashing scenes of beaches, forests and car rides.	
"Bad Blood"	May 17, 2015	Kendrick Lamar	Joseph Kahn	When Swift is betrayed by her secret agent partner, she prepares to exact vengeance with the help of her friends. It broke the Vevo record for most-viewed music video in the first 24 hours at the time of release and currently has over 1.2 billion views on YouTube. The video received eight nominations at the 2015 MTV Video Music Awards, winning Video of the Year and Best Collaboration, and won the Grammy Award for Best Music Video.	
"Wildest Dreams"	August 30, 2015	None	Joseph Kahn	Set in the 1950s, the video focuses on Swift and her acting leading man love interest (Scott Eastwood) filming a romance movie. At the film's premiere, Swift is heartbroken when she sees her love interest with his wife and flees the premiere. All of the proceeds from the video went to wild animal conservation efforts through the African Parks Foundation of America.	
"Out of the Woods"	December 31, 2015	None	Joseph Kahn	The video finds Swift running from the elements on several locations, such as a beach, snowy mountains, an ocean, a barren landscape, a muddy swamp, and a burning forest, all in an effort to find herself.	
"New Romantics"	April 6, 2016	None	Jonas Åkerlund	The video shows several clips of Swift onstage performing during the 1989 World Tour.	
"I Don't Wanna Live Forever"	January 27, 2017	Zayn	Grant Singer	Swift and Zayn wander through a dark hotel, throwing objects like glasses, lamps and pillows across their separate rooms in anger.	
"Look What You Made Me Do"	August 27, 2017	None	Joseph Kahn	The video features several of her previous public personas—including a ballet dancer, a circus marshall and a studious high school student—and takes jabs at the fictionalized portrayals of her in the media. The music video for the song broke the 24-Hour Vevo Record with over 43 million views on its first day.	
"...Ready for It?"	October 26, 2017	None	Joseph Kahn	Swift fights her deceptive hooded, dark, robotic counterpart for freedom from an invisible prison in which she is trapped. The video is set in a futuristic atmosphere and features sci-fi and anime references.	
"End Game"	January 12, 2018	Ed Sheeran; Future	Joseph Kahn	The video is set in Miami, Tokyo, and London, and features Swift partying with Sheeran and riding in a Lamborghini Aventador with Future.	
"Delicate"	March 11, 2018	None	Joseph Kahn	The video features Swift discovering that she is invisible after a mystery man hands her a note. She is later seen dancing carelessly through a hotel, public transportation and rainy streets.	
"Babe"	June 9, 2018	Sugarland	Anthony Mandler	The video features Brandon Routh and Jennifer Nettles as a married couple while Swift plays the role of a secretary who is in an affair with her married boss (Routh).	
"Me!" •	April 26, 2019	Brendon Urie	Taylor Swift; Dave Meyers	The video features Swift and Urie as a couple who get into a fight before Swift storms out into a colorful wonderland. The video broke the Vevo record, as well as the YouTube record for most views in the first 24 hours for a lead female video, and the third most-viewed overall earning 65.2 million views.	
"You Need to Calm Down" •	June 17, 2019	None	Taylor Swift; Drew Kirsch	Swift lives in a trailer park, hanging out in a swimming pool as her trailer burns behind her. A pop queen pageant is also held and Swift reunites with Katy Perry as she hugs her wearing a french fries costume while Perry wore a hamburger costume. The video won Video of the Year at the 2019 MTV Video Music Awards.	
"Lover" •	August 22, 2019	None	Taylor Swift; Drew Kirsch	Swift and dancer Christian Owens portray a couple who live in a colorful house inside a snow globe, which they later give to their daughter as a Christmas present.	
"Christmas Tree Farm" •	December 6, 2019	None	Taylor Swift	The video showcases home videos of Swift and her family during Christmas at her childhood home in Pennsylvania.	
"The Man" •	February 27, 2020	None	Taylor Swift	Swift takes on gender stereotypes by portraying a sleazy, egotistical businessman who throws temper tantrums and behaves in a stereotypically macho manner. The video features cameos from Loren Gray, Dwayne Johnson, and Swift's father. The video earned Swift the award for Best Direction at the 2020 MTV Video Music Awards.	
"Cardigan" •	July 24, 2020	None	Taylor Swift	Swift starts by playing a piano and reminiscing about old memories, before stepping into her piano which takes her running through a forest. The piano takes her to a lake, where she is seen holding onto the piano with both hands, struggling to hold on. The lake piano leads her back home, where the song ends with her donning a cardigan.	
"Cardigan" (Cabin in Candlelight Version) •	July 30, 2020	None	Taylor Swift	The video shows behind the scenes footage for the Folklore album photoshoot along with clips of Swift sauntering through fields, leaning against trees and sitting on a swing.	
"Willow" •	December 11, 2020	None	Taylor Swift	The video, inspired by tracks on Folklore, continues where that of "Cardigan" leaves off. Swift steps back into the piano to follow a golden thread that takes her past a lakeside, circus, dark forest, troupe of dancers, and back home to her cabin where she reunites with her love interest, played by the dancer Taeok Lee.	
"The Best Day" (Taylor's Version) •	April 29, 2021	None	Taylor Swift	A music video similar to the original, featuring new home videos of Swift and her mom along with footage of Swift with her father and brother. The video uses the same footage as the one in the lyric video.	
"Renegade"	July 2, 2021	Big Red Machine	Michael Brown	The video features images and video clips of Swift and handwritten lyrics from the song through colorful collages and filters.	
"I Bet You Think About Me"	November 15, 2021	Chris Stapleton	Blake Lively	The video was written by Swift and Lively and directed by Lively in her directorial debut. It depicts a man, played by the actor Miles Teller, imagining his former lover, played by Swift, while at his wedding to another woman, played by Teller's wife Keleigh Sperry Teller.	
"The Joker and the Queen"	February 10, 2022	Ed Sheeran	Emil Nava	Swift does not appear in the music video, but her vocals are still heard. The video is a sequel to the events in the video for "Everything Has Changed" and features the same principal cast.	
"Anti-Hero" •	October 21, 2022	None	Taylor Swift	Swift encounters her worst enemy: another version of herself. Years later, at her funeral, her children (played by John Early, Mike Birbiglia and Mary Elizabeth Ellis) bicker over her will.	
"Bejeweled" •	October 25, 2022	None	Taylor Swift	In a reimagination of the classic Cinderella fairytale, House Wench Taylor escapes from her cruel stepmother (Laura Dern) and stepsisters (the Haim sisters) into the magical elevator of a building. As she passes through the different floors, Taylor encounters the Fairy Goddess (Dita Von Teese) and impresses the Queen (Pat McGrath) in a talent contest, winning a proposal from the Prince (Jack Antonoff) and ownership of a castle. She rejects the Prince but keeps the castle for herself.	
"Lavender Haze" •	January 27, 2023	None	Taylor Swift	A psychedelic and surrealist video depicting Swift and her lover (Laith Ashley) in a 1970s-inspired house afloat in space, surrounded by large koi fish. The house conjures a lavender-colored fog.	
"Karma" •	May 27, 2023	Ice Spice	Taylor Swift	Swift and Ice Spice navigate various mythological and high fantasy worlds.	
"I Can See You" •	July 8, 2023	None	Taylor Swift	Joey King, Taylor Lautner, and Presley Cash break Swift free from imprisonment and execute a heist together in an action film-style video inspired by Swift's efforts to regain ownership of her masters.	
"Fortnight" •	April 19, 2024	Post Malone	Taylor Swift	A dystopian and Victorian video depicting Swift in an asylum grappling with her relationship with Post Malone, featuring cameos from two members of the cast of Dead Poets Society (1989), Ethan Hawke and Josh Charles, as mad scientists.	
"I Can Do It with a Broken Heart" •	August 20, 2024	None	Taylor Swift	The video showcases footage from the Eras Tour, including performances, rehearsals, audience, and backstage videos.	
"The Fate of Ophelia" •	October 3, 2025	None	Taylor Swift	Swift portrays various showgirls in different historical eras while performing a choreography involving dancers from the Eras Tour.	
"Opalite" •	February 6, 2026	None	Taylor Swift	The video is set in 1990s and begins with a commercial for a "Opalite" potion, which Swift and her eventual love interest (Domhnall Gleeson) use to meet each other. They go on a mall date and compete in a dance competition. The video contains appearances and cameos from guests from a 2025 episode of The Graham Norton Show hosted by Graham Norton, which Swift was a guest on with Gleeson, Jodie Turner-Smith, Greta Lee, Lewis Capaldi and Cillian Murphy.	
"Elizabeth Taylor"	March 31, 2026	None	Various	Swift does not appear in the music video, but her vocals are still heard. The video is a compilation of Elizabeth Taylor's film footages, including A Place in the Sun (1951), Boom! (1968), Cat on a Hot Tin Roof (1958), Cleopatra (1963), Father of the Bride (1950), Giant (1956), Julia Misbehaves (1948), Love Is Better Than Ever (1952), Rhapsody (1954), Suddenly, Last Summer (1959) and Who's Afraid of Virginia Woolf? (1966).	
"I Knew It, I Knew You"	June 5, 2026	None	Various	Swift does not appear in the music video, but her vocals are still heard. It is a compilations of footages from the Toy Story franchise, focusing on Jessie.	
"I Knew It, I Knew You" (Piano Version)	August 27, 2026	None	Andrew Stanton	Swift does not appear in the music video, but her vocals are still heard. The video is a compilations of scenes from Toy Story 5.	
"Patient Zero" •	September 27, 2026	None	Taylor Swift	The video has Dakota Johnson and Colin Farrell portraying a couple whose relationship appears on the rocks, with Swift as a counselor to the lady, wearing the same apparell. Farrell is later seen getting angry at Johnson after a banquet, seemingly gaslighing her with accusations about her drinking, after she has become upset at the sight of him flirting with female guests. The finale reveals that Swift is a ghost and was Farrell's late companion, with similar experience to Johnson.	

== Video albums ==
Title	Album details	Notes
Speak Now World Tour – Live	Released: November 21, 2011; Label: Big Machine; Formats: Digital download, streaming, CD+DVD/Blu-ray	The live album, DVD and Blu-ray release feature live concert audio and performances from Swift's North American leg of the Speak Now World Tour.

== Filmography ==
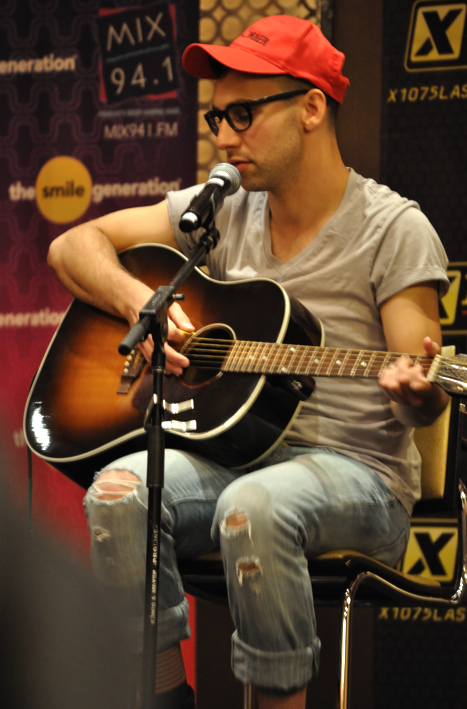
Jack Antonoff appears in the films Miss Americana, Folklore: The Long Pond Studio Sessions and "Bejeweled".

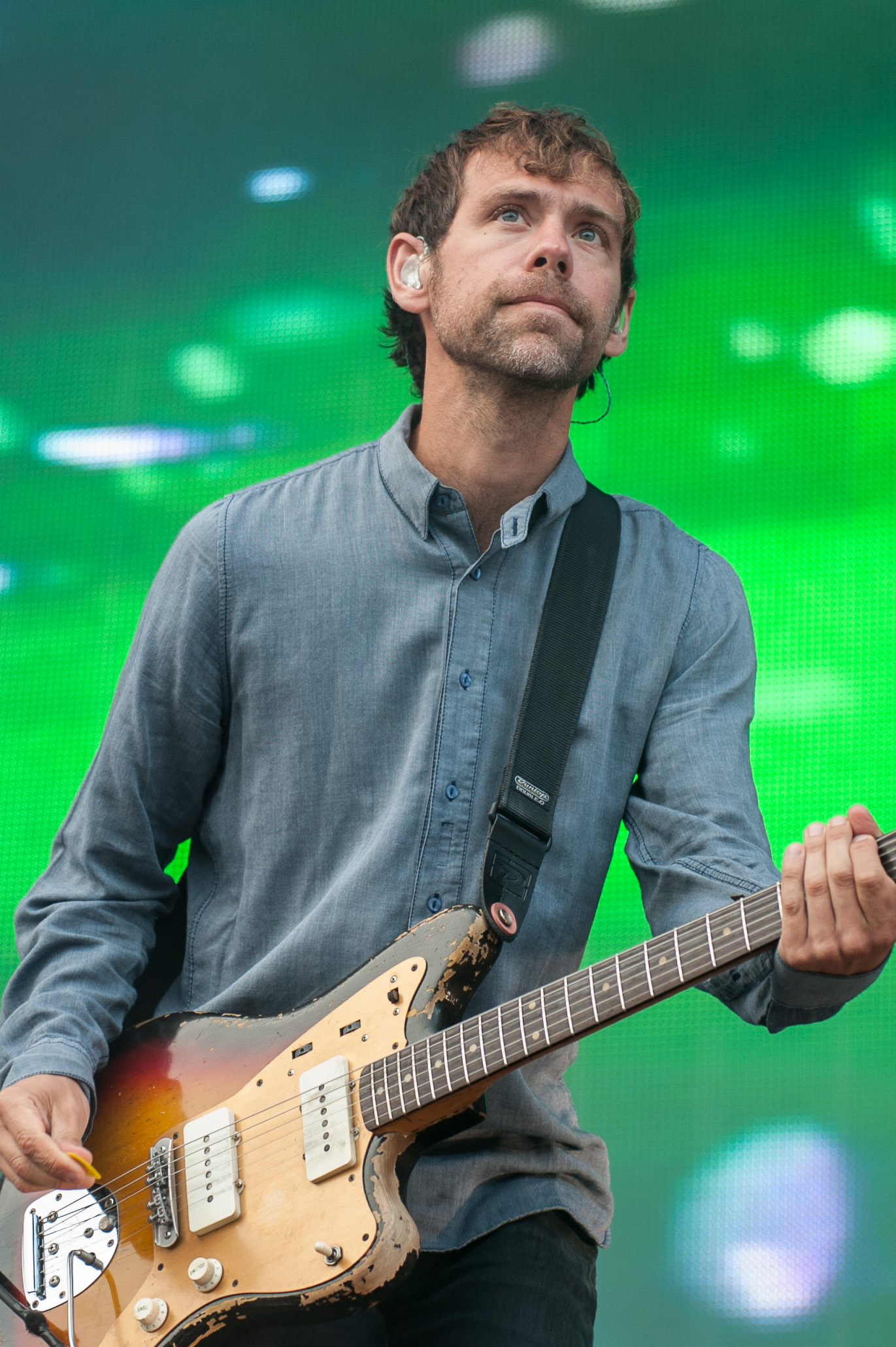
Aaron Dessner performs in Folklore: The Long Pond Studio Sessions and "I Bet You Think About Me".

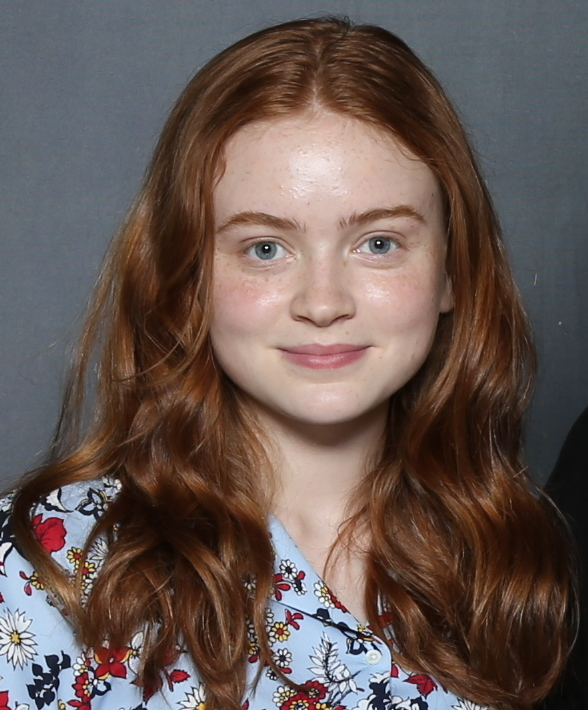
Sadie Sink played the female lead in Swift's self-directed All Too Well: The Short Film.

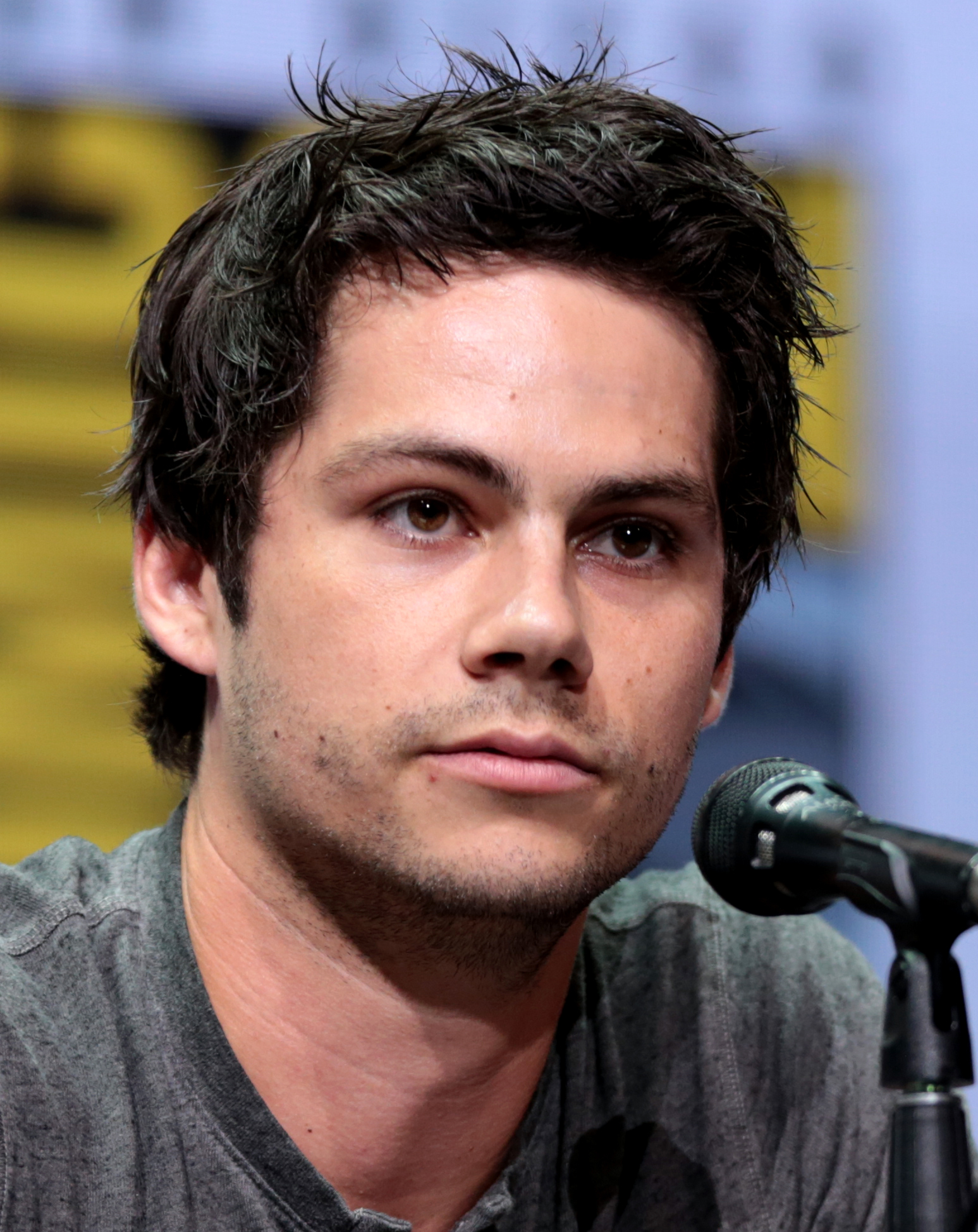
Dylan O'Brien played the male lead in All Too Well: The Short Film.

Year	Title	Role	Notes
2009	Jonas Brothers: The 3D Concert Experience	Herself	
2009	Hannah Montana: The Movie	Herself	
2010	Valentine's Day	Felicia Miller	
2012	The Lorax	Audrey	Voice role
2014	The Giver	Rosemary	
2015	The 1989 World Tour Live	Herself	
2018	Taylor Swift: Reputation Stadium Tour	Herself	
2019	Bluebird	Herself	
2019	Cats	Bombalurina	
2020	Miss Americana	Herself	
2020	Taylor Swift: City of Lover	Herself	
2020	Folklore: The Long Pond Studio Sessions	Herself	Also director and producer
2021	All Too Well: The Short Film	Older Her	Short film; also writer and director
2022	Amsterdam	Liz Meekins	
2023	Taylor Swift: The Eras Tour	Herself	
2025	Taylor Swift: The Official Release Party of a Showgirl	Herself	Also writer and director
2025	Taylor Swift: The Eras Tour: The Final Show	Herself	

== Television ==
Title	Year	Role	Notes
Good Morning America	2004; 2006; 2008; 2012; 2014; 2019–2021		In 2004, 14-year-old Swift was interviewed for the first time by them as part of a television special covering new artists in Nashville who dream of "becoming a country music star".
GAC Shortcuts: A Place in this World	2006	Herself	
Once Upon a Prom	2008	Herself	Television special
2008 MTV Video Music Awards	2008	Herself	Opening Act (pre-show) Co-Host/Fashion Correspondent
CMT Crossroads	2008	Herself	S7E4: "Taylor Swift and Def Leppard"
The Ellen DeGeneres Show	2008–2012; 2014; 2019	Herself	
CSI: Crime Scene Investigation	2009	Haley Jones	Episode: "Turn, Turn, Turn"
2009 MTV Movie Awards	2009	Twilight High School Student	Cold open skit
Late Night with Jimmy Fallon	2009	Herself	
Saturday Night Live	2009	Herself	Host/Musical guest (two episodes)
Journey to Fearless	2010	Herself	Three-part series aired on The Hub and released on video
Taylor Swift: Speak Now	2010	Herself	One-hour concert and documentary special aired on NBC on Thanksgiving Day.
Take Two with Phineas and Ferb	2011	Herself	
2011 CMT Music Awards	2011	Herself	Thelma & Louise parody skit with Shania Twain
Punk'd	2012	Herself	
20/20	2012	Herself	
VH1 Storytellers	2012	Herself	
The Jonathan Ross Show	2012	Herself	
The GRAMMY Nominations Concert Live	2012	Herself	Co-host with LL Cool J
60 Minutes	2012–2013	Herself	
Alan Carr: Chatty Man	2012; 2014		
New Girl	2013	Elaine	Episode: "Elaine's Big Day"
El Hormiguero	2013	Herself	
CBS This Morning	2013–2014	Herself	
The Voice	2013–2014; 2019	Herself	Guest appearance (season 4); Musical guest (season 16); Knockout Round advisor (seasons 7 and 17)
Saturday Night Live	2014; 2017; 2019; 2021; 2023	Herself	Guest appearance in the opening monologue (S39E18); Musical guest (S43E5, S45E2, and S47E6); Guest appearance in the "Three Sad Virgins" skit (S47E6); Guest appearance in introducing musical guest (S49E1)
Late Night With Seth Meyers	2014; 2021; 2025	Herself	
The View	2014	Herself	
The Talk	2014	Herself	
Jimmy Kimmel Live!	2014; 2020	Herself	
Barbara Walters' 10 Most Fascinating People	2014	Herself	
The Graham Norton Show	2013–2014; 2019; 2022; 2025	Herself	
The Tonight Show Starring Jimmy Fallon	2014–2015; 2019; 2021–2022; 2025	Herself	
Saturday Night Live 40th Anniversary Special	2015	Herself/Alison	Television special; guest appearance in "The Californians" skit
The Tonight Show Starring Jimmy Fallon	2017	Herself	Musical guest (Episode 768)
2019 NFL draft on ABC	2019	Herself	
CBS News Sunday Morning	2019	Herself	
Kids Say the Darndest Things	2019	Herself	
Strictly Come Dancing	2019	Herself	Musical guest (S17 Finale)
The Today Show	2019	Herself	With cast of Cats
The Late Late Show with James Corden	2019	Herself	With cast of Cats
One World: Together at Home	2020	Herself	Television special
Dear Class of 2020	2020	Herself	
Selena + Chef	2020	Herself	Episode: "Selena + Roy Choi"
The Late Show with Stephen Colbert	2020; 2025	Herself	
Impact x Nightline on Hulu	2022	Herself	Episode: "Taylor's Ticketmaster Disaster"
Impact x Nightline on Hulu	2023	Herself	Episode: "Taylor + Travis"
Dancing with the Stars	2023	Herself	Episode: "A Celebration of Taylor Swift" (S32E9)
Taylor Swift: The End of an Era	2025	Herself	Six-episode Disney+ behind-the-scenes docuseries of The Eras Tour
78th Primetime Emmy Awards	2026	Detective	Pre-recorded Law & Order: Special Victims Unit skit

== Commercials ==
Company	Year	Promoting	Title	Theme song(s)	Region	Ref.
Activision	2009	Band Hero	—N/a	"Love Story"	United States	
Nashville Predators	2009	Sports event	—N/a	—N/a	United States	
Sony	2010	Cyber-shot DSC-TX7	—N/a	—N/a	United States	
Target	2010	Speak Now deluxe edition	—N/a	"Mine"	United States	
CoverGirl	2010–2011	Cosmetics	—N/a	—N/a	United States	
Elizabeth Arden, Inc.	2011	Wonderstruck / Wonderstruck Enchanted fragrance	"The Beginning of Something Magical"	"Enchanted"	United States	
Vogue	2012	Fashion's Night Out 2012	—N/a	—N/a	United States	
Macy's	2012	Wonderstruck Enchanted fragrance	—N/a	—N/a	United States	
Macy's	2012	Donations by Macy's to the Make-A-Wish Foundation	"Another Miracle on the 34th Street"	—N/a	United States	
Target	2012	Red deluxe edition	—N/a	"Red"	United States	
Sony	2012	Sony NEX-5R	—N/a	—N/a	United States	
MTV	2012	2012 MTV Video Music Awards	—N/a	"We Are Never Ever Getting Back Together"	United States	
The Recording Academy	2012	54th Annual Grammy Awards	—N/a	—N/a	United States	
Keds	2013	Shoes	"Be Brave"	—N/a	United States	
Ulta Beauty	2013	Taylor by Taylor Swift fragrance	"Made of Starlight"	"Starlight"	United States	
Coca-Cola	2013	Diet Coke	"Stay Extraordinary"	"22"	United States	
Coca-Cola	2014	Diet Coke	"What if life tasted as good as a Diet Coke?"	"How You Get the Girl"	United States	
Target	2014	1989 deluxe edition	"There's Only One Place to Get More Taylor"	"Style"	United States / Canada	
Keds	2014	Shoes	"Bravehearts"	—N/a	United States	
Elizabeth Arden, Inc.	2014	Incredible Things fragrance	—N/a	—N/a	United States	
Toyota	2015	Lexus hybrid car	—N/a	"Wildest Dreams" featuring Lang Lang	China	
Evolution of Smooth (EOS)	2015	Lip balm	—N/a	—N/a	China	
Keds	2015	Shoes	"Ladies First"	—N/a	United States	
Apple Music	2016	Streaming service	"Distractingly good"	"Jumpman" by Drake and Future	United States	
Apple Music	2016	Streaming service	"Every song for every moment"	"The Middle" by Jimmy Eat World	United States	
Apple Music	2016	Streaming service	"Dance like no one's watching"	"I Believe in a Thing Called Love" by the Darkness	United States	
DirecTV and DirecTV Now	2016	Taylor Swift NOW	"AT&T Presents Taylor Swift NOW"	—N/a	United States	
DirecTV and DirecTV Now	2017	Taylor Swift NOW	"See What Taylor's Up To NOW"	—N/a	United States	
United Parcel Service	2017	Package delivery	"#TaylorSwiftDelivery"	"Look What You Made Me Do"	United States	
Target	2017	Reputation magazines	"Look What You Made Me Do"	"...Ready for It?"	United States	
DirecTV and DirecTV Now	2018	DirecTV Now	"Taylor Swift's Caticorn Adventure"	—N/a	United States	
ESPN	2019	2019 NFL draft	—N/a	"Me!"	United States	
Capital One	2019	Credit card	—N/a	"Me!"	United States	
Capital One	2020	Bank	—N/a	"Cardigan"	United States	
NBC	2021	2020 Summer Olympics	"Taylor Swift Women's All-Around"	"Evermore"	United States / Japan	
NBC	2021	2020 Summer Olympics	"Taylor Swift hypes up the USWNT"	"You Need to Calm Down"	United States / Japan	
NBC	2021	2020 Summer Olympics	"Simone Biles + Taylor Swift"	"This Is Me Trying"	United States / Japan	
Capital One	2022	Credit card	"Taylors through all her Eras"	"Anti-Hero"	United States	
NBC	2024	2024 Summer Olympics	—N/a	"Style (Taylor's Version)"	United States / France	
NBC	2026	2026 Winter Olympics	—N/a	"Opalite"	United States / Italy	
