= All of the Girls You Loved Before =

2023 song by Taylor Swift

Promotional single by Taylor Swift

from the EP The More Lover Chapter
- Released: March 17, 2023
- Genre: Synth-pop
- Length: 3:41
- Label: Republic
- Songwriters: Taylor Swift; Louis Bell; Adam King Feeney
- Producers: Taylor Swift; Louis Bell; Frank Dukes

Audio video
- "All of the Girls You Loved Before" on YouTube

"All of the Girls You Loved Before" is a song by the American singer-songwriter Taylor Swift and an outtake from her seventh studio album, Lover (2019). After its demo version was leaked online and went viral on TikTok, "All of the Girls You Loved Before" was surprise-released on March 17, 2023, ahead of Swift's sixth concert tour, the Eras Tour. Swift wrote and produced the song with Frank Dukes and Louis Bell.

A synth-pop love song with a doo-wop progression, "All of the Girls You Loved Before" has lyrics about a narrator's gratitude to the women in her boyfriend's life, including his former girlfriends, for shaping his experiences which led him to her. Music critics complimented the song for its affectionate lyrics and dreamy production. The track charted within the top 25 in several countries and peaked at number 10 on the Billboard Global 200. It received certifications in Australia, New Zealand, and the United Kingdom.

== Background and release ==
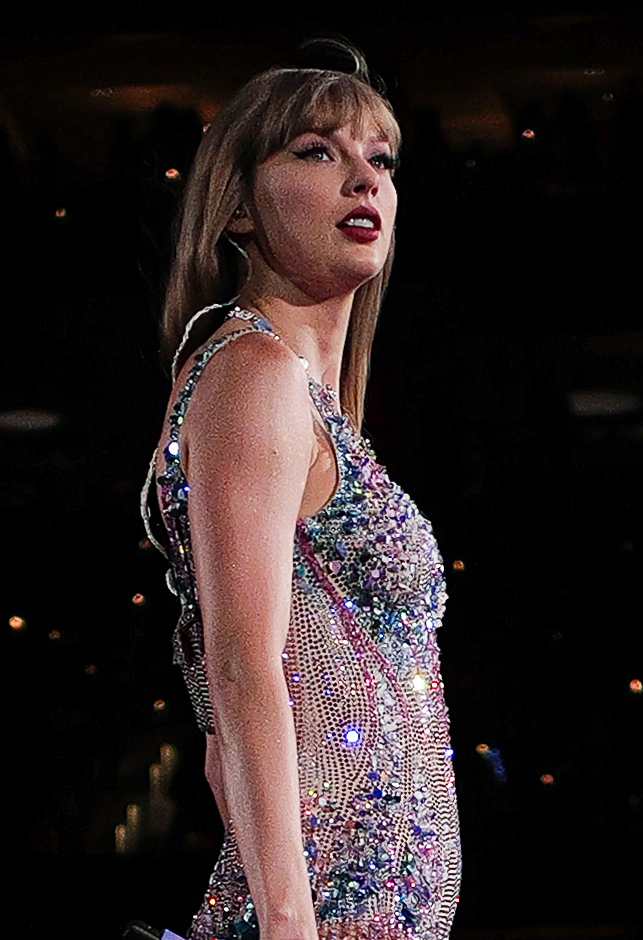
Swift released "All of the Girls You Loved Before" prior to embarking on the Eras Tour in 2023.

Taylor Swift released her seventh studio album, Lover, on August 23, 2019. The album received positive critical reviews and was the global best-selling album by a solo artist of 2019. Swift planned to embark on a concert tour to support Lover in summer 2020 but canceled the plan due to the COVID-19 pandemic. During the lockdowns in 2020, she released the indie folk albums Folklore and Evermore. After that, she released two re-recorded albums, Fearless (Taylor's Version) and Red (Taylor's Version), in 2021, and another studio album, Midnights, in 2022.

To support Midnights and all of her discography up until that point, Swift embarked on her sixth headlining concert tour and her first in five years, the Eras Tour, on March 17, 2023. The day The Eras Tour kicked off in Glendale, AZ she released four songs: three re-recordings of previously released songs ("Eyes Open (Taylor's Version)", "Safe & Sound (Taylor's Version)", and "If This Was a Movie (Taylor's Version)") and a previously unreleased track ("All of the Girls You Loved Before"). "All of the Girls You Loved Before" is a song Swift had written and intended to include on Lover but did not make the final tracklist. Prior to the song's release, a demo titled "All of the Girls" was leaked online and went viral on TikTok in February 2023. "All of the Girls You Loved Before" was also included on The More Lover Chapter, a streaming-exclusive compilation that also includes select Lover tracks. On July 29, Swift performed the track as a "surprise song" at the Eras Tour show in Santa Clara, California. She sang it again in 2024 as part of a mashup with her song "Crazier" (2009) at the tour's Edinburgh stop on June 8.

== Composition ==
"All of the Girls You Loved Before" was written and produced by Swift, Frank Dukes, and Louis Bell. Dukes is credited under his birthname, Adam King Feeney, as writer. Musicians who played instruments on the track include Dukes (keyboard and guitar) and Matthew Tavares (guitar). Bell and Dukes programmed the song, which was mixed by Serban Ghenea and mastered by Randy Merrill.

"All of the Girls You Loved Before" is a synth-pop song that incorporates a slow jam groove and the doo-wop progression and soft synths, which bring forth a soundscape that critics described as "dreamy" and "ethereal". The track is a love song and media publications interpreted it as a message to her then-boyfriend, the English actor Joe Alwyn, although Swift did not confirm the inspiration. In the lyrics, a female narrator reflects on her past loves before meeting her current lover ("Crying in the bathroom for some dude whose name I cannot remember now"); some critics interpreted this lyric as a reference to the events described in Swift's song "All Too Well (10 Minute Version)". She discusses her romantic partner's past love life and expresses gratitude to his ex-girlfriends for making him the righteous man he is now. In the bridge, she appreciates his mother ("Your mother brought you up loyal and kind") and all the women in his life and promises to love him forever.

== Critical reception ==
In The New York Times, critic Jon Pareles described the track's lyrics as "Swift at her most forgiving". Jake Viswanath of Bustle opined that "All of the Girls You Loved Before" would have "fit perfectly" on Lover and lauded it as a "spellbound yet self-assured" love song. The Straits Times described it as a catchy tune that has all of the characteristics of a "Swift bop": a memorable, catchy melody and lyrical storytelling. The Independent's Annabel Nugent complimented the production as "dreamy and ethereal pop gold" and the lyrics as "breezy", and The Times' Will Hodgkinson picked the track as an example of "what Taylor Swift does best: to feel things deeply, then present those feelings in a way that anyone, whatever their situation, can relate to". Writing for the Philippine newspaper The Freeman, Januar Junior Aguja lauded the song as both refreshing and familiar, and he wrote that it could have been included as a bonus track on Lover.

== Commercial performance ==
"All of the Girls You Loved Before" debuted at number 10 on the Billboard Global 200 and was Swift's 14th top-10 entry on the chart, a record among women. In the United States, the song opened at number 12 on the Billboard Hot 100. It extended three of Swift's all-time records: the song marked the 189th Hot 100 entry of her career (the most among women), her 80th top-10 entry on the Digital Songs chart (the most for any act), and her first new Hot 100 entry in 2023 (Swift holds the longest streak on the Hot 100 as the first artist with an uninterrupted 18-year run on the chart, having charted a song every year since her debut with "Tim McGraw" in 2006). Despite not being released as a single, the song also entered Billboard's Pop Airplay chart, where it peaked at number 35 and charted for four weeks.

Elsewhere, "All of the Girls You Loved Before" debuted on the charts of several countries: it peaked within the top 25 in the Philippines (6), Ireland (9), the United Kingdom (11), Canada (12), New Zealand (13), Singapore (13), Australia (15), Malaysia (17), and Hungary (22). The Australian Recording Industry Association (ARIA) gave the song a platinum certification, which denotes 70,000 units based on sales and streaming figures.

== Personnel ==
Credits adapted from Tidal

- Taylor Swift – vocals, songwriter, producer
- Louis Bell – producer, songwriter, recording engineer, programming
- Frank Dukes – producer, songwriter, programming, keyboards, guitar
- Matthew Tavares – guitar
- Serban Ghenea – mixer
- Bryce Bordone – mix engineer
- Randy Merrill – mastering

== Charts ==
Chart performance for "All of the Girls You Loved Before"
| Chart (2023) | Peak position |
|---|---|
| Australia (ARIA) | 15 |
| Canada Hot 100 (Billboard) | 12 |
| Global 200 (Billboard) | 10 |
| Greece International (IFPI) | 47 |
| Hungary (Single Top 40) | 22 |
| Ireland (IRMA) | 9 |
| Japan Hot Overseas (Billboard Japan) | 18 |
| Malaysia (Billboard) | 21 |
| Malaysia International (RIM) | 17 |
| Netherlands (Dutch Global Top 40) | 24 |
| Netherlands (Single Top 100) | 90 |
| New Zealand (Recorded Music NZ) | 13 |
| Norway (VG-lista) | 32 |
| Philippines (Billboard) | 6 |
| Portugal (AFP) | 64 |
| Singapore (RIAS) | 13 |
| South Korea BGM (Circle) | 124 |
| Sweden (Sverigetopplistan) | 55 |
| UK Singles (Official Charts) | 11 |
| US Billboard Hot 100 | 12 |
| US Pop Airplay (Billboard) | 35 |

== Certifications ==
Certifications for "All of the Girls You Loved Before"
| Region | Certification | Certified units/sales |
|---|---|---|
| Australia (ARIA) | Platinum | 70,000^{‡} |
| New Zealand (RMNZ) | Gold | 15,000^{‡} |
| United Kingdom (BPI) | Silver | 200,000^{‡} |
^{‡} Sales+streaming figures based on certification alone.
