= Crazier =

2009 song by Taylor Swift

Song by Taylor Swift

from the album Hannah Montana: The Movie
- Released: March 24, 2009
- Genre: Country
- Length: 3:12
- Label: Walt Disney
- Songwriters: Taylor Swift; Robert Ellis Orrall
- Producers: Taylor Swift; Nathan Chapman

Audio video
- "Crazier" on YouTube

"Crazier" is a song by the American singer-songwriter Taylor Swift from the soundtrack to the 2009 film Hannah Montana: The Movie. Swift wrote the song with Robert Ellis Orrall and produced it with Nathan Chapman. A country ballad, the song has lyrics about falling in love. In the film, Crowley Corners organizes a barn party where Swift makes an appearance as herself, performing "Crazier".

"Crazier" was released on Radio Disney and Disney Channel, and peaked at number 17 on the US Billboard Hot 100 and was certified platinum by the Recording Industry Association of America (RIAA). It also entered the singles charts in Australia, Canada, and the United Kingdom. "Crazier" was praised by critics, many of whom named it the best song on the soundtrack. Swift performed the song as part of a mashup with "All of the Girls You Loved Before" (2023) on June 8, 2024, in Edinburgh as part of the Eras Tour (2023–2024).

== Background and release ==
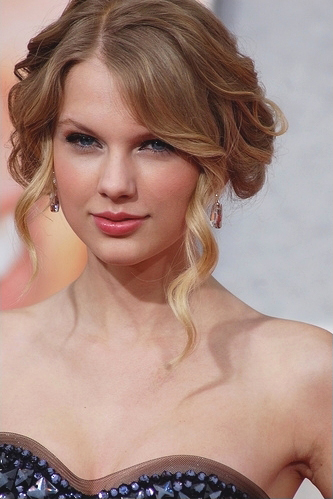
Swift at the 2009 premiere of Hannah Montana: The Movie

Taylor Swift co-wrote "Crazier" with Robert Ellis Orrall. The song is set in compound time with six eighth notes per bar. It is played in E major at a moderately fast tempo of 144 beats per minute. Swift's vocals span from E_{3} to B_{4}. The chorus has a chord progression of E—B—C#m—A. USA Today described it as a "pretty waltz".

The song's appearance in Hannah Montana: The Movie came about after filmmakers approached Swift about using her music in the film. Film officials emailed her asking for a song "that was perfect to fall in love to" and "sort of a country waltz". Although it was not written intentionally for the film, Swift sent in "Crazier" and the filmmakers "loved it". In addition, Swift offered to perform the song in the film herself as a cameo appearance. In the film, Swift performs at an open mic fundraiser to save a small town's treasured park from developers. The quick scene was filmed in a single day, but Swift's performance impressed film members. The film director Peter Chelsom said, "I've made a very big mental check to work with her again." A music video for "Crazier", directed by Peter Chelsom, features excerpts from Hannah Montana: The Movie and premiered on March 28, 2009, on the Disney Channel. It features Swift playing the song on acoustic guitar and her backup band playing other instruments, intertwined with scenes of the movie characters Miley Stewart (Miley Cyrus) and Travis Brody (Lucas Till).

== Critical reception ==
Critics generally praised "Crazier" as a highlight from the Hannah Montana soundtrack. Heather Phares of AllMusic praised the track, calling it the best song on the soundtrack. She complimented it for being "more genuine, more effortless, than any of [Cyrus'] or Hannah's tracks". James Berardinelli agreed, stating, "Arguably, the movie's biggest mistake is having [Swift] perform a song, since she can sing and the comparison is not flattering to the movie's star." Leah Greenblatt of Entertainment Weekly described "Crazier" as "a pretty, yearning ballad". Premiere magazine reviewer Olivia Putnal referred to Swift's performance as one of the film's "high points". Peter Hartlaub of the San Francisco Chronicle believed that her cameo was enjoyable, but also called it a mistake on the part of the filmmakers, explaining "Swift is so talented that she makes Cyrus seem bland by comparison." Perry Seibert from TV Guide wrote, "when genuine teen star [Swift] shows up to perform [...] she demonstrates all the spontaneity and authenticity that Miley Cyrus lacks." In June 2022, Insider ranked "Crazier" as Swift's fourth best soundtrack song.

== Chart performance ==
"Crazier" made its debut on the Billboard Hot 100 at number 72 on the week ending April 11, 2009. "Crazier" rose three spots to number 69 in the following week, and jumped to number 38 on the week ending April 25, 2009, due to an 87 percent increase in digital downloads. For the week of Saturday, May 2, 2009, the song reached its peak on the Hot 100 at number 17, selling 110,000 downloads. It also peaked at number 28 on the Pop 100 chart. As of November 2014, "Crazier" has sold one million copies in the United States.

As the song was not officially released to radio as a single, digital sales also accounted for its appearance on international charts. The song debuted at number 79 on the week ending April 11, 2009. For the week ending May 2, 2009, it reached number 30 on Hot Canadian Digital Singles and number 63 on the Canadian Hot 100. "Crazier" reached number 57 on the Australian Singles Chart. The song debuted and peaked at number 100 on the UK Singles Chart for the week ending May 16, 2009.

== Charts ==
Weekly chart performance for "Crazier"
Chart (2009)	Peak position
Australia (ARIA)	57
Canada Hot 100 (Billboard)	67
UK Singles (Official Charts)	100
US Billboard Hot 100	17
US Pop 100 (Billboard)	11

== Certifications ==
Certifications for "Crazier"
Region	Certification	Certified units/sales
Australia (ARIA)	Platinum	70,000^{‡}
New Zealand (RMNZ)	Gold	15,000^{‡}
United States (RIAA)	Platinum	1,000,000^{‡}
^{‡} Sales+streaming figures based on certification alone.
