= Call It What You Want (Taylor Swift song) =

2017 song by Taylor Swift

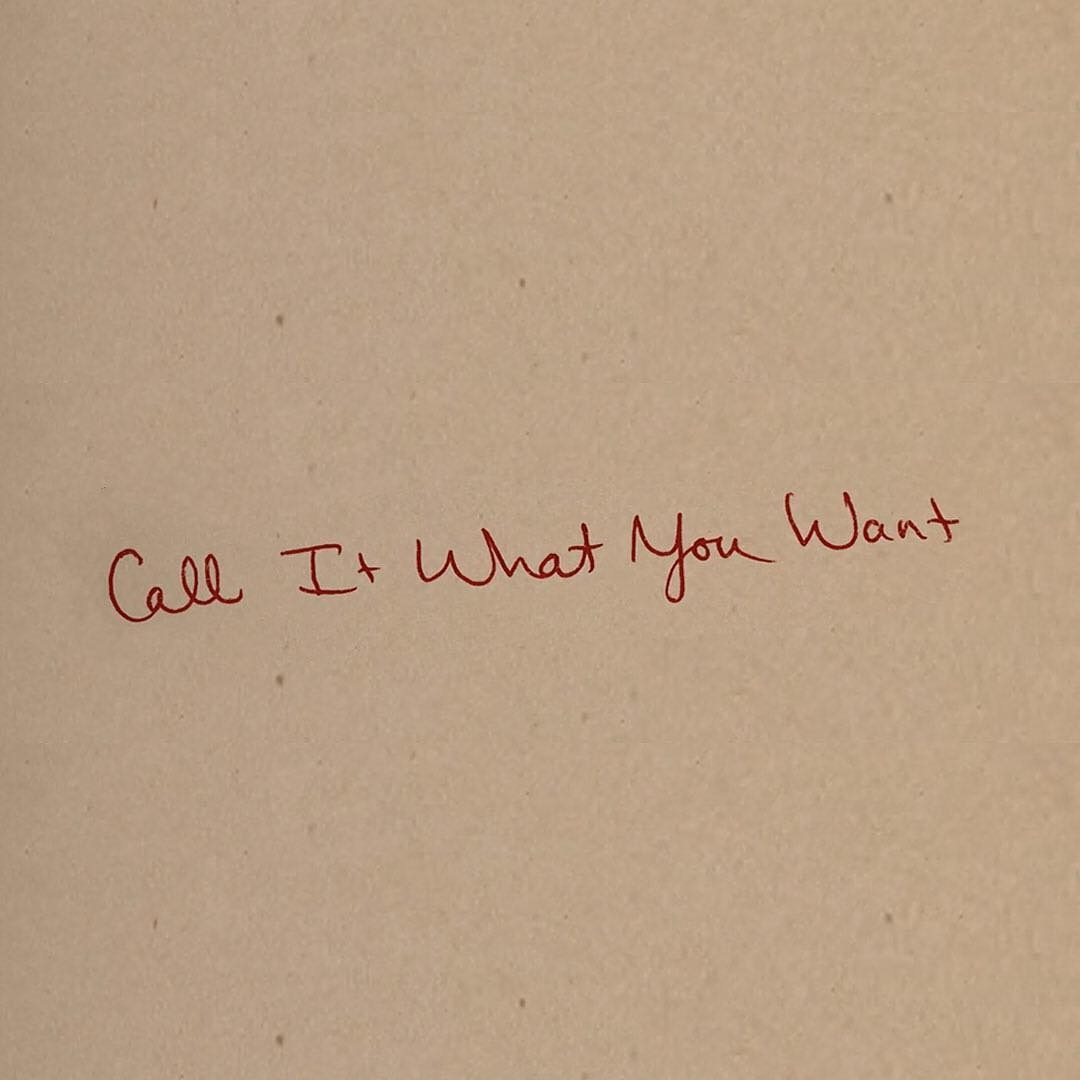
- Promotional graphic

Promotional single by Taylor Swift

from the album Reputation
- Released: November 3, 2017
- Studio: Rough Customer (Brooklyn Heights)
- Genre: Electropop; synth-pop
- Length: 3:24
- Label: Big Machine
- Songwriters: Taylor Swift; Jack Antonoff
- Producers: Taylor Swift; Jack Antonoff

Lyric video
- "Call It What You Want" on YouTube

"Call It What You Want" is a song by the American singer-songwriter Taylor Swift from her sixth studio album, Reputation (2017). Written and produced by Swift and Jack Antonoff, the song is a mid-tempo electropop and synth-pop ballad with R&B-trap crossover elements. Its lyrics are about the transformative power of a romantic relationship that helps Swift cope with the tumultuous outer world. Big Machine Records released the song for download and streaming on November 3, 2017, as a promotional single prior to the album's release.

Music critics received "Call It What You Want" with positive reviews, praising the vulnerability and intimacy depicted in its songwriting and production. The song reached the top 40 on singles charts in Austria, Hungary, Ireland, Malaysia, New Zealand, the Philippines, the UK, and the US. It received certifications in Australia, Brazil, New Zealand, the UK, and the US. Swift performed "Call It What You Want" live on Saturday Night Live in 2017, on the Reputation Stadium Tour in 2018, and four times on the Eras Tour in 2023 and 2024.

== Background and release ==
Taylor Swift achieved her status as a pop icon with her synth-pop fifth studio album, 1989 (2014), which was a huge commercial success. Her rising fame was accompanied by increasing tabloid scrutiny, and a series of publicized romantic relationships and celebrity disputes blemished her once-wholesome-and-innocent image as "America's Sweetheart". Swift thereafter went into a hiatus, during which she conceived her sixth studio album, Reputation (2017), as a response to the media commotion surrounding her celebrity. According to Swift, Reputation has two major themes; one is vengeance and drama, and the other about finding love, friendship, and "something sacred throughout all the battle cries".

"Call It What You Want" was released digitally as a promotional single for Reputation on November 3, 2017, by Big Machine Records. It was the fourth track made available to promote the album, following "Look What You Made Me Do", "...Ready for It?", and "Gorgeous". The track is number 14, the penultimate song on the album's track listing. A lyric video was released concurrently; it features handwritten lyrics and homemade video shots of Swift, in minimal makeup, in various settings: playing an acoustic guitar, recording a song, riding a horse, enjoying a bonfire, and playing with a dog.

"Call It What You Want" debuted at number 27 on the US Billboard Hot 100 and became Swift's 15th number-one song and Reputation's fourth number-one track on the Digital Song chart. In March 2018, the song received a gold certification from the Recording Industry Association of America. Elsewhere, the track peaked within the top 50 on charts of Hungary (5), Malaysia (13), Australia (16), the Philippines (27), the UK (29), New Zealand (34), Austria (43), and Ireland (44). It has been certified platinum in Australia and New Zealand and gold in Brazil and the UK.

== Production and music ==
Swift wrote and produced "Call It What You Want" with Jack Antonoff, who programmed the track, played instruments, and provided background vocals on it. The song was engineered by Laura Sisk at Rough Customer Studio in Brooklyn Heights, mixed by Serban Ghenea at MixStar Studios in Virginia Beach, and mastered by Randy Merrill at Sterling Sound Studios in New York City. According to Antonoff, he created the track using an Akai MPC drum machine, string sounds generated with a Yamaha DX7, live kick drums, and made "[Swift's] voice into an instrument" by incorporating samples of her vocals throughout the intro and the track.

"Call It What You Want" is an atmospheric, mid-tempo electropop and synth-pop song with a simple chord progression and a crossover R&B-trap inclination. According to music critics, Its balladic production is subdued and airy, which brings a contemplative listening experience. The music critic Annie Zaleski described the sound as "laid-back", while Antonoff tweeted that the track was best listened to "on headphones at night on a walk". "Call It What You Want" features Swift rapping and singing in her lower vocal register over skittering 808 drums and a sparse electronic beat with occasional drumbeat accentuations.

== Lyrics ==
The lyrics of "Call It What You Want" are about the transformative power of a nurturing romantic relationship amidst chaos of the outer world. Music critics interpreted the track as a reference to Swift's relationship with the English actor Joe Alwyn. Although Swift's narrator acknowledges her public fallings and dramas, she finds solace in her lover who is described as understanding, loving, and protective. In an album-listening session with iHeartRadio upon Reputation's release, Swift shared that "Call It What You Want" concluded the narrative arc of the album and reflected her state of mind at that time: "[The album] starts with just getting out any kind of rebellion, or anger, or angst, or whatever. And then, like, falling in love, and realizing that you kind of settle into what your priorities are."

As with other Reputation songs, "Call It What You Want" references Swift's tumultuous state of mind while facing the controversies that she was experiencing. The first verse describes how her reputation was damaged using imagery of royalty and war: "My castle crumbled overnight/ I brought a knife to a gunfight/ They took the crown but it's alright." It also asserts that she has found solace and peace during this period, referencing her hiatus and retreat from the spotlight: "I'm doing better than I ever was." The second verse details how Swift has found love amidst her darkest days, referring to her lover as a king that makes all the haters and naysayers "fade into nothing when I look at him". This man enlightens Swift's world by lighting up a fire to keep her warm, and she trusts him "like a brother".

The refrains find Swift appreciating her lover, using British English vocabulary: "My baby's fit like a daydream." She also feels appreciated that this man "loves me like I'm brand new". In the bridge, Swift affirms that she proudly wears a chain with this man's initials on her neck, because "he really knows me", and reflects on a moment "late November" when she asked him if he would "run away with me". In an analysis for the New Statesman, Anna Leskiewicz identified recurring motifs and imagery that Swift had used in her previous songs: kingdoms, fairy tales, royalty, fire, and flowers; in "Call It What You Want", they are used in a more self-referential way, representing a growth in self-image.

== Critical reception ==
"Call It What You Want" received critical acclaim, with praise for the vulnerability in its songwriting and production. According to Entertainment Weekly, the song was also well received among Swift's fan base, Swifties, for its affecting sentiments. Rolling Stone ranked it at number 20 on their list of the 50 best songs of 2017, writing that it successfully captured the "vibrant spirit" of Reputation after the mixed results of the previous promotional tracks like "Look What You Made Me Do" and "Gorgeous". Multiple reviews considered "Call It What You Want" a significant improvement over those songs. Frazier Tharpe of Complex lauded the straightforward strong structure and simple arrangement that made the emotional sentiments palpable, while Patrick Ryan of USA Today regarded the lyrics as mature and "the most perceptive" of Swift's new album era. Billboard placed "Call It What You Want" at number 64 on their list of the 100 best songs by Swift; Andrew Unterberger hailed it as a "sweet and simple" love song and highlighted its sentiment as "defiant acquiescence".

Several reviews of the album that picked "Call It What You Want" as a highlight also commented on its production and sound: Kitty Empire of The Observer deemed it excellent, and ABC News praised it as a beautiful, "lush ballad" with "chilled vocals" and a "focus track" of the album. Roisin O'Connor of The Independent lauded the track as "arguably, the best song she has ever made"; she ranked it sixth among the 100 select tracks by Swift, highlighting its vulnerable sentiments. Reviewing Reputation for The Atlantic, Spencer Kornhaber compared the refrain's phrasings to a Nelly song and the "frigid verses" to the sound of Kanye West's 808s & Heartbreak (2008), but said that the lyrics were "pure Swift", making it a highlight. The Line of Best Fit's Eleanor Graham picked the track as one of the album's more pleasant musical moments, highlighting the "synth wheeze" in the second pre-chorus that evoked Kanye West, and The Music's Uppy Chatterjee wrote that the song is "definitely an earworm". Rob Sheffield of Rolling Stone placed the song 57th out of Swift's total 274 songs as of April 2025, calling it "the warmest Rep electro-ballad".

A few other reviews were more reserved. In Spin, Jeremy Gordon thought that the music was pleasant to listen to and the lyrics were interesting in their callbacks to Swift's previous songs, but he contended that it still came off as generic, similar to the other Reputation tracks, and that the lyrics were sometimes nonsensical or awkward. Frank Guan of Vulture contended that the track was decent enough, but he took issue with the tone as "smug and downtrodden at the same time" and that the lyrical sentiments were conflicting, as they somehow showed that Swift still cared what others thought of her.

== Live performances ==
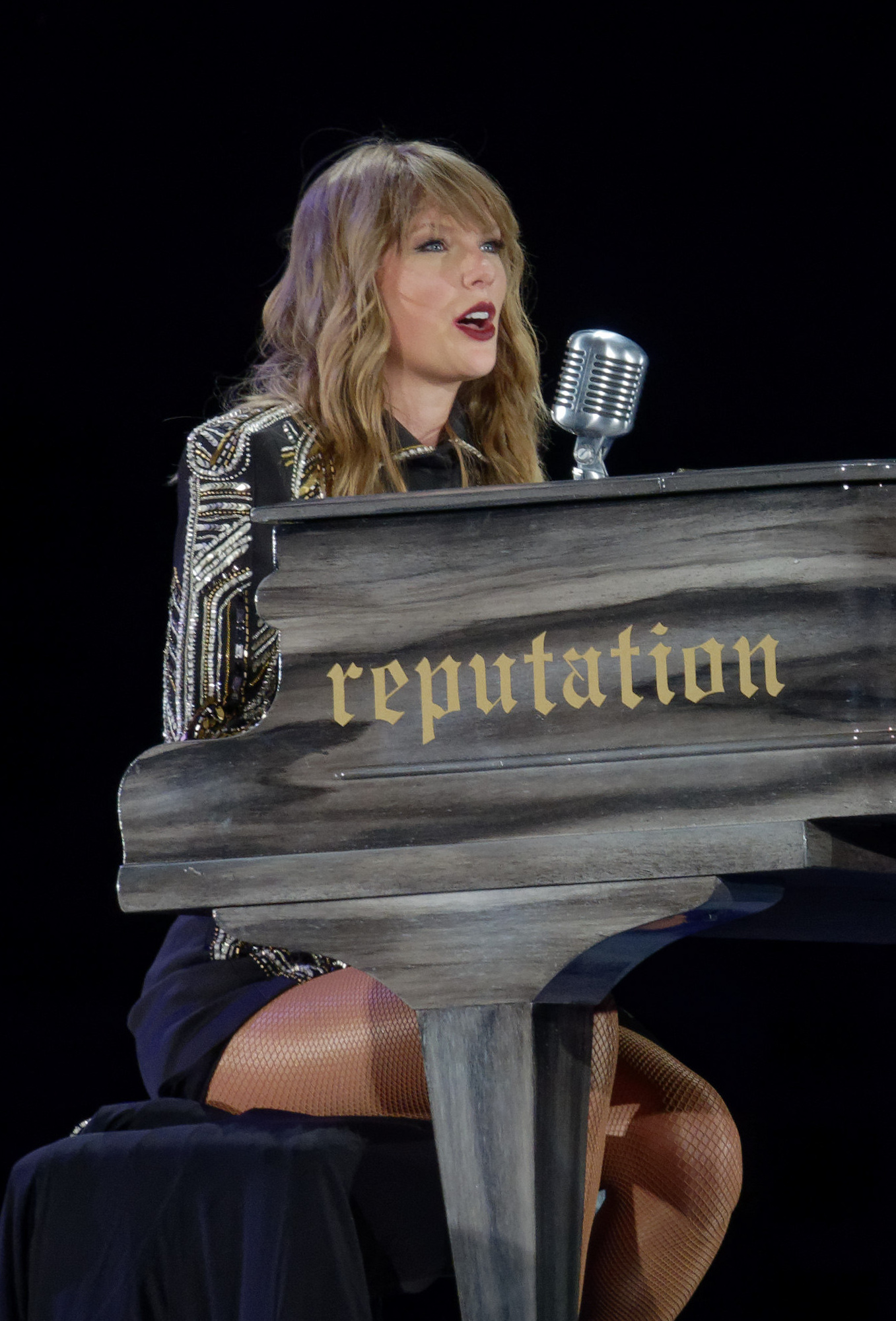
Swift performed the song on her 2018 Reputation Stadium Tour.

Swift performed an acoustic version of "Call It What You Want" during a SiriusXM Fishbowl session for a small group of select fans on November 10, 2017, in New York City; she sang the track on an acoustic guitar, backed by a group of vocalists, another guitarist, and a celloist. A day later, Swift performed an acoustic version of the song again during an episode of the 43rd season of Saturday Night Live, backed by a group of four vocalists.

"Call It What You Want" was part of the regular set list of Swift's fifth concert tour, the Reputation Stadium Tour (2018). Swift performed it during the final act, as the penultimate number of the show, as the stage featured a working fountain and the screen projected a mansion that evoked the settings of The Great Gatsby.

Swift performed "Call It What You Want" as a "surprise song" four times on the Eras Tour (2023–2024). She sang it on an upright piano during the July 1, 2023, show in Cincinnati, Ohio. In 2024, she performed it as part of mashups with her other songs during three shows: with "This Love" on piano (Singapore, March 4), with "Ivy" on piano (Munich, July 27), and with "Our Song" on guitar (New Orleans, October 25).

== Personnel ==
Credits are adapted from the liner notes of Reputation.

- Taylor Swift – vocals, songwriter, producer
- Jack Antonoff – producer, songwriter, programming, instruments, background vocals
- Laura Sisk – engineer
- Serban Ghenea – mixing
- John Hanes – mix engineer
- Randy Merrill – mastering

== Charts ==
Chart performance for "Call It What You Want"
Chart (2017–2018)	Peak position
Australia (ARIA)	16
Austria (Ö3 Austria Top 40)	43
Canada Hot 100 (Billboard)	24
France (SNEP)	76
Germany (GfK)	99
Hungary (Single Top 40)	5
Ireland (IRMA)	44
Malaysia (RIM)	13
New Zealand (Recorded Music NZ)	34
Philippines (Philippine Hot 100)	27
Portugal (AFP)	65
South Korean International Singles (Gaon)	80
Switzerland (Schweizer Hitparade)	96
UK Singles (Official Charts)	29
US Billboard Hot 100	27

== Certifications ==
Certifications for "Call It What You Want"
Region	Certification	Certified units/sales
Australia (ARIA)	Platinum	70,000^{‡}
Brazil (Pro-Música Brasil)	Gold	20,000^{‡}
New Zealand (RMNZ)	Platinum	30,000^{‡}
United Kingdom (BPI)	Gold	400,000^{‡}
United States (RIAA)	Gold	500,000^{‡}
^{‡} Sales+streaming figures based on certification alone.

== See also ==
- List of number-one digital songs of 2017 (U.S.)
