= I Know Places =

2014 song by Taylor Swift

Song by Taylor Swift

from the album 1989
- Released: October 27, 2014
- Studio: Conway Recording, Los Angeles
- Genre: Trip hop; drum and bass
- Length: 3:15
- Label: Big Machine
- Songwriters: Taylor Swift; Ryan Tedder
- Producers: Taylor Swift; Ryan Tedder; Noel Zancanella

Audio video
- "I Know Places" on YouTube

"I Know Places" is a song by the American singer-songwriter Taylor Swift from her fifth studio album, 1989 (2014). She wrote the song with Ryan Tedder, and the two produced it with Noel Zancanella. A trip hop and drum and bass song with influences of reggae and trap in its instrumentation, "I Know Places" is about a couple's struggle with public scrutiny. Music critics generally praised the composition and imagery of "I Know Places", with some deeming it one of 1989's most vulnerable and underrated tracks, although a handful of them deemed it a weaker track in her discography.

"I Know Places" received gold certifications in Australia and the United States. Swift performed the song on the 1989 World Tour (2015) and as a surprise number in select shows in her future tours. Following a 2019 dispute over her masters, Swift re-recorded the song as "I Know Places (Taylor's Version)" for her fourth re-recorded studio album, 1989 (Taylor's Version) (2023). Critics praised its increase in power in Swift's vocals compared to the original version.

== Background and writing ==
The American singer-songwriter Taylor Swift abandoned the country stylings of her past music and embraced a pop production for her fifth studio album, 1989 (2014). Her musical inspiration was 1980s synth-pop and its experimentation with synthesizers, drum pads, and overlapped vocals. She began writing the album in mid–2013 while touring in support of her fourth album, Red (2012), and enlisted prominent contemporary pop producers including Ryan Tedder, whom she contacted via a Voice Memo. In that voice memo, Swift sang a demo of the chorus while playing a piano.

During the production of 1989, Swift faced a lot of media scrutiny, which she said put her in a place where "no one is going to sign up for [a relationship]". Swift stated, "There are just too many cameras pointed at me. There are too many ridiculous elaborations about my life". She stated that she wrote "I Know Places" after fantasizing about a relationship in which she "[met] someone awesome, and they were like, hey, I'm worried about all this attention you get", with Swift responding, "Hey, I know places we can hide. We could outrun them".

== Lyrics and composition ==
"I Know Places" is a trip hop and drum and bass song about the pressures of public scrutiny. With a length of three minutes and fifteen seconds, "I Know Places" is co-written by Swift and Tedder, who co-produced the track alongside Noel Zancanella. The song was recorded at Conway Recording, located at Los Angeles. It contains influences of reggae and incorporates trap-inspired snare beats. It takes a seemingly hopeless perspective on a lifestyle where nothing is private, and Swift's need to "hide [her personal information] from the world". It has angry and anthemic feels in the verses and chorus, which were praised by Cosmopolitan's Eliza Thompson. In an interview with Grammy Pro, Swift mentioned that the love she wrote about in "I Know Places" was similar to that of her 2016 single "Out of the Woods". "I Know Places" portrays the paparazzi as people that "cage" celebrities and put them into "boxes", with the lyrics showing Swift "running from something" despite being painted as a role model to other people. It builds up trap-influenced snare drums before launching into a chorus reminiscent of the American singer-songwriter Pat Benatar. The song also focuses on Swift's desire to preserve an unstable relationship.

== Critical reception ==
"I Know Places" received generally positive reviews from contemporary critics. In a ranking of Swift's entire catalog, Rob Sheffield of Rolling Stone placed "I Know Places" at number 115, describing it as "underrated" and saying that Swift "goes all Kate Bush" in the song". While ranking every track on 1989's standard edition, Christine DiStasio of Bustle ranked "I Know Places" at number four, praising the song's intense imagery and suspense and claiming that it was unsuspected by anyone. DiStasio deemed "I Know Places" 1989's most vulnerable track, believing that it made her worried about Swift's well-being. Lindsay Zoladz, writing for Vulture, compared "I Know Places" to the soundtrack of the dystopian film The Hunger Games: Mockingjay – Part 1 (2014). Zoladz thought that the song was inspired by the "moody" and "electro-minimalist" vibe of the New Zealand singer-songwriter Lorde, who curated the soundtrack album to the film. The Independent's Roisin O'Connor ranked "I Know Places" 34th out of 100 select album tracks of Swift, praising the way Swift sounds "delightfully menacing" with the lyrics: "Loose links sink ships all the damn time/ Not this time". However, O'Connor also described the song as an inferior version of "Out of the Woods". Nate Jones, writing for Vulture, criticized the song's "lack of universality" but praised its "slice of gothic pop-star paranoia", which gave 1989 a "much-needed bit of edge". In a ranking of Swift's entire catalog, Jones ranked "I Know Places" at number 122 in 2024.

== Release, live performances, and covers ==
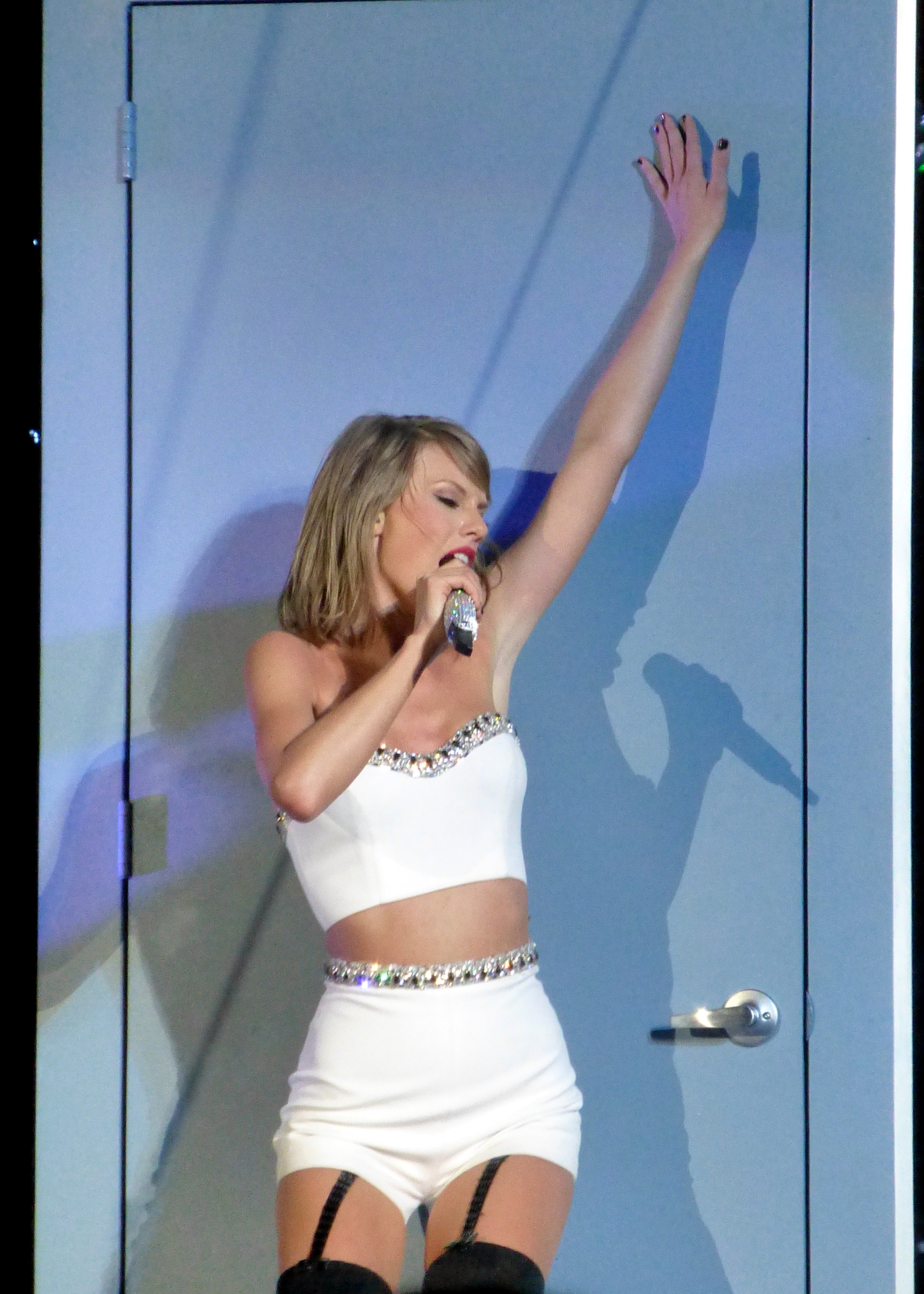
Swift performing "I Know Places" on the 1989 World Tour

Big Machine Records released 1989 on October 27, 2014; "I Know Places" is number 12 on the standard track listing. The song received received gold certifications in Australia (ARIA) and the United States (RIAA).

Swift performed "I Know Places" as part of the permanent setlist of the 1989 World Tour (2015), during which Swift wears thigh-high black boots and garters. The song's intense lyrics and production are accompanied by a performance of Swift being chased by the masked dancers through multiple mobile doors as she sings "They are the hunters / We are the foxes". Outside the 1989 World Tour, Swift performed the song as a surprise song during the Reputation Stadium Tour (2018) (Tokyo, first show) and the Eras Tour (2023–2024) (Los Angeles, fifth show). During the first Edinburgh show of the Eras Tour, Swift performed "I Know Places" in a mashup with "Would've, Could've, Should've" (2022). The Australian singer-songwriter Vance Joy recorded a video of him covering "I Know Places" to his YouTube channel. Swift described his cover as "so mesmerizing" and "so pretty". The American singer-songwriter Ryan Adams covered the song as part of his track by track cover of 1989.

== Personnel ==
Adapted from the liner notes of 1989

- Taylor Swift – writer, producer, executive producer, lead vocals, background vocals
- Max Martin – executive producer
- Ryan Tedder – producer, recording, writer, additional programming, piano, Juno, acoustic guitar, electric guitar, drum programming, additional synth, background vocals
- Noel Zancanella – producer, additional programming, drum programming, synthesizer, bass, additional synth

== Chart ==
Chart performance for "I Know Places"
Chart (2014)	Peak position
Canada Digital Song Sales (Billboard)	51

== Certifications ==
Certifications for "I Know Places"
Region	Certification	Certified units/sales
Australia (ARIA)	Gold	35,000^{‡}
United Kingdom (BPI)	Silver	200,000^{‡}
United States (RIAA)	Gold	500,000^{‡}
^{‡} Sales+streaming figures based on certification alone.

== "I Know Places (Taylor's Version)" ==
"I Know Places (Taylor's Version)"

Song by Taylor Swift

from the album 1989 (Taylor's Version)
- Released: October 27, 2023
- Studio: Mandarin Oriental, Milan
- Length: 3:15
- Label: Republic
- Songwriters: Taylor Swift; Ryan Tedder
- Producers: Taylor Swift; Ryan Tedder; Noel Zancanella

Lyric video
- "I Know Places (Taylor's Version)" on YouTube

After signing a new contract with Republic Records, Swift began re-recording her first six studio albums in November 2020. The decision followed a public 2019 dispute between Swift and the talent manager Scooter Braun, who acquired Big Machine Records, including the masters of Swift's albums which the label had released. By re-recording the albums, Swift had full ownership of the new masters, which enabled her to control the licensing of her songs for commercial use. In doing so, she hoped that the re-recorded songs would substitute the Big Machine–owned masters.

The re-recording of "I Know Places", subtitled "Taylor's Version" was released as part of 1989's re-recording, 1989 (Taylor's Version) (2023). Swift produced "I Know Places (Taylor's Version)" with Ryan Tedder and Noel Zancanella, who reprised their co-production roles. The re-recording is also three minutes and fifteen seconds long, but is recorded at Mandarin Oriental, located in Milan, instead. Upon release, all songs on 1989 (Taylor's Version) entered the US Billboard Hot 100, with "I Know Places (Taylor's Version)" peaking at 36. The re-recording also charted in Canada (35), Greece (41), New Zealand (32), the United Kingdom (38), and the Billboard Global 200 (30).

=== Critical reception ===
Rachel Martin of Notion praised the uptick in emotion in the vocals of "I Know Places (Taylor's Version)", alongside its "more powerful end", and the addition of more "depth and emotion" made by a few tweaks in the bridge of the song. Kelsey Barnes of The Line of Best Fit hailed the re-recording as one of the best re-recordings on 1989 (Taylor's Version), elaborating that it is "more guttural" and hypothesizing that Swift "[channeled] her anger" at media scrutiny into the recording. Jonathan Keefe of Slant Magazine praised Swift's vocals' soar in power in "I Know Places (Taylor's Version)".

=== Personnel ===
Adapted from the liner notes of 1989 (Taylor's Version)

- Taylor Swift – vocals, background vocals
- Ryan Tedder – background vocals, piano, synthesizer, acoustic guitar, drum programming, electric guitar, programming
- Noel Zancanella – drum programming, synthesizer, bass guitar, programming
- Orion Meshorer – acoustic guitar, electric guitar
- Randy Merrill – mastering
- Ryan Smith – mastering
- Serban Ghenea – mixing
- Rich Rich – engineering
- Ryan Tedder – engineering
- Derek Garten – engineering, editing
- Christopher Rowe – vocal engineering

=== Charts ===
Chart performance for "I Know Places (Taylor's Version)"
Chart (2023)	Peak position
Canada Hot 100 (Billboard)	35
Global 200 (Billboard)	30
Greece International (IFPI)	41
New Zealand (Recorded Music NZ)	32
UK Streaming (OCC)	38
US Billboard Hot 100	36
