= List of Billboard Digital Song Sales number ones of 2017 =

2017 highest-selling digital singles in the United States

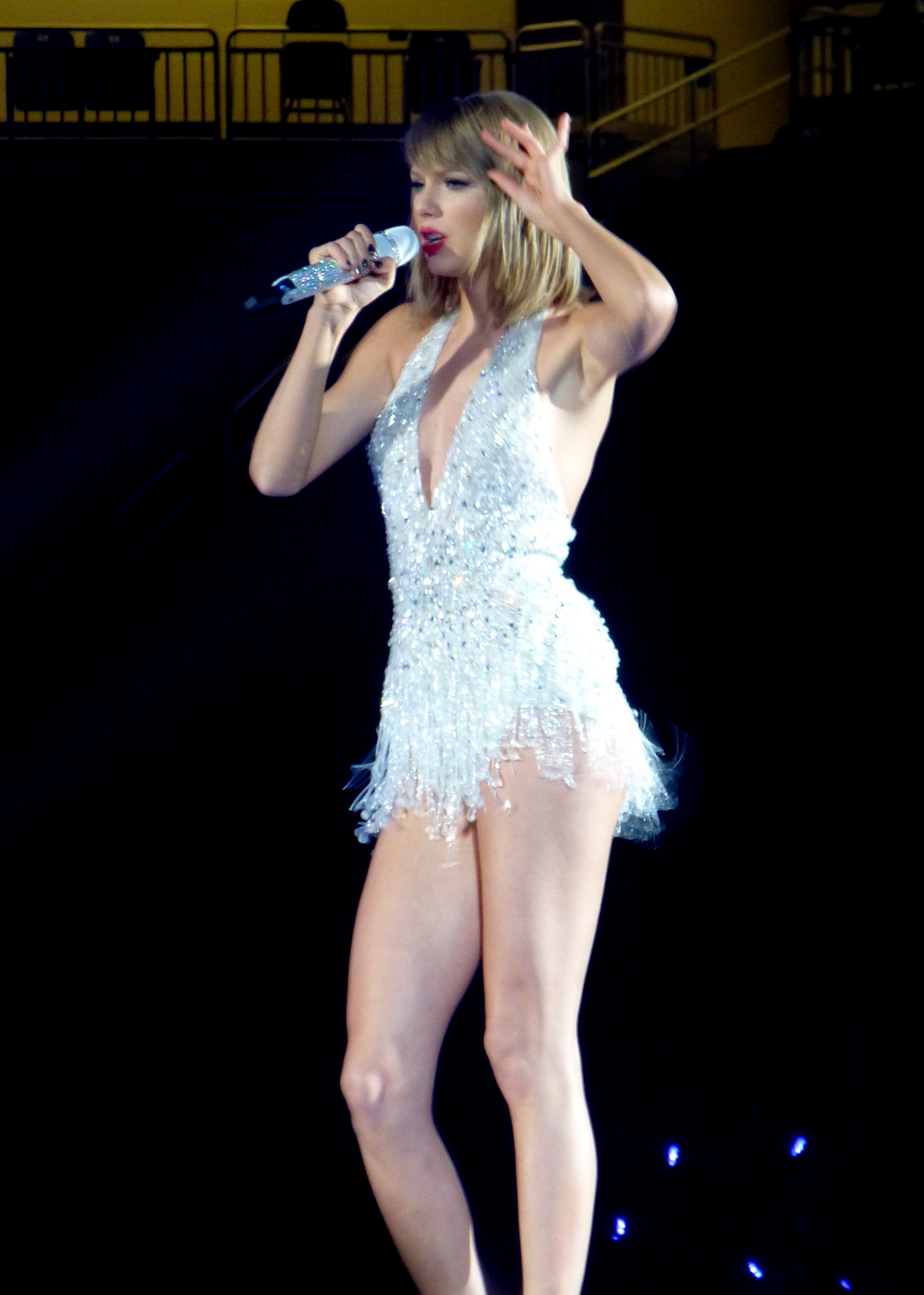
Taylor Swift (pictured) reached number one with five singles this year, the most by any act with her songs "I Don't Wanna Live Forever", "Look What You Made Me Do", "...Ready for It?", "Gorgeous" and "Call It What You Want". This also made Swift the artist with the most number one singles on this chart (15) surpassing Rihanna.

The Billboard Digital Song Sales chart is a chart that ranks the most downloaded songs in the United States. Its data is compiled by Nielsen SoundScan based on each song's weekly digital sales, which combines sales of different versions of a song by an act for a summarized figure.

== Chart history ==
Key
†	Indicates best-performing single of 2017

Issue date	Song	Artist(s)	Weekly sales	Ref(s)
January 7	"Starboy"	The Weeknd featuring Daft Punk	86,000	
January 14	"Black Beatles"	Rae Sremmurd featuring Gucci Mane	136,000	
January 21	"24K Magic"	Bruno Mars	77,000	
January 28	"Shape of You"	Ed Sheeran	240,000	
February 4	"Shape of You"	Ed Sheeran	120,000	
February 11	"Shape of You"	Ed Sheeran	104,000	
February 18	"I Don't Wanna Live Forever"	Zayn and Taylor Swift	188,000	
February 25	"Million Reasons"	Lady Gaga	149,000	
March 4	"Shape of You"	Ed Sheeran	200,000	
March 11	"Shape of You"	Ed Sheeran	147,000	
March 18	"Shape of You"	Ed Sheeran	141,000	
March 25	"Shape of You"	Ed Sheeran	116,000	
April 1	"Shape of You"	Ed Sheeran	104,000	
April 8	"Shape of You"	Ed Sheeran	97,000	
April 15	"Shape of You"	Ed Sheeran	85,000	
April 22	"Humble"	Kendrick Lamar	111,000	
April 29	"Sign of the Times"	Harry Styles	142,000	
May 6	"Stay"	Zedd and Alessia Cara	91,000	
May 13	"Despacito" †	Luis Fonsi and Daddy Yankee feat. Justin Bieber	86,000	
May 20	"I'm the One"	DJ Khaled feat. Justin Bieber, Quavo, Chance the Rapper, and Lil Wayne	171,000	
May 27	"Despacito" †	Luis Fonsi and Daddy Yankee feat. Justin Bieber	104,000	
June 3	"Despacito" †	Luis Fonsi and Daddy Yankee feat. Justin Bieber	115,000	
June 10	"Despacito" †	Luis Fonsi and Daddy Yankee feat. Justin Bieber	137,000	
June 17	"Despacito" †	Luis Fonsi and Daddy Yankee feat. Justin Bieber	148,000	
June 24	"Despacito" †	Luis Fonsi and Daddy Yankee feat. Justin Bieber	141,000	
July 1	"Despacito" †	Luis Fonsi and Daddy Yankee feat. Justin Bieber	140,000	
July 8	"Despacito" †	Luis Fonsi and Daddy Yankee feat. Justin Bieber	139,000	
July 15	"Despacito" †	Luis Fonsi and Daddy Yankee feat. Justin Bieber	136,000	
July 22	"Despacito" †	Luis Fonsi and Daddy Yankee feat. Justin Bieber	129,000	
July 29	"Despacito" †	Luis Fonsi and Daddy Yankee feat. Justin Bieber	124,000	
August 5	"Despacito" †	Luis Fonsi and Daddy Yankee feat. Justin Bieber	118,000	
August 12	"Despacito" †	Luis Fonsi and Daddy Yankee feat. Justin Bieber	102,000	
August 19	"Despacito" †	Luis Fonsi and Daddy Yankee feat. Justin Bieber	84,000	
August 26	"Despacito" †	Luis Fonsi and Daddy Yankee feat. Justin Bieber	82,000	
September 2	"Despacito" †	Luis Fonsi and Daddy Yankee feat. Justin Bieber	83,000	
September 9	"Despacito" †	Luis Fonsi and Daddy Yankee feat. Justin Bieber	80,000	
September 16	"Look What You Made Me Do"	Taylor Swift	353,000	
September 23	"...Ready for It?"	Taylor Swift	135,000	
September 30	"Too Good at Goodbyes"	Sam Smith	90,000	
October 7	"Rockstar"	Post Malone feat. 21 Savage	80,000	
October 14	"Thunder"	Imagine Dragons	65,000	
October 21	"Mi Gente"	J Balvin and Willy William featuring Beyoncé	79,000	
October 28	"Almost Like Praying"	Lin-Manuel Miranda featuring Artists for Puerto Rico	111,000	
November 4	"Thunder"	Imagine Dragons	66,000	
November 11	"Gorgeous"	Taylor Swift	68,000	
November 18	"Thunder"	Imagine Dragons	54,000	
November 25	"Call It What You Want"	Taylor Swift	68,000	
December 2	"Havana"	Camila Cabello featuring Young Thug	75,000	
December 9	"Havana"	Camila Cabello featuring Young Thug	85,000	
December 16	"Perfect"	Ed Sheeran featuring Beyoncé	69,000	
December 23	"Perfect"	Ed Sheeran featuring Beyoncé	181,000	
December 30	"Perfect"	Ed Sheeran featuring Beyoncé	98,000	
