= Dancing with Our Hands Tied =

2017 song by Taylor Swift

Song by Taylor Swift

from the album Reputation
- Released: November 10, 2017
- Studio: MXM (Los Angeles; Stockholm); Conway Recording (Los Angeles)
- Length: 3:31
- Label: Big Machine
- Songwriters: Taylor Swift; Max Martin; Shellback; Oscar Holter
- Producers: Max Martin; Shellback; Oscar Holter

Audio video
- "Dancing with Our Hands Tied" on YouTube

"Dancing with Our Hands Tied" is a song by the American singer-songwriter Taylor Swift from her sixth studio album, Reputation (2017). Swift wrote the song with the producers Max Martin, Shellback, and Oscar Holter. An electronic-heavy track, "Dancing with Our Hands Tied" is instrumented with propelling beats, an EDM and future bass refrain, and elements of dubstep, UK garage, drum and bass, and house music. The lyrics are about a secret romantic relationship in the face of public exposure.

Several critics praised the production of "Dancing with Our Hands Tied" as catchy and sophisticated. The track has received certifications in Australia, New Zealand, and the UK. Swift performed the track as an acoustic number on her Reputation Stadium Tour (2018), and twice as a "surprise song" on the Eras Tour (2023–2024).

== Background and release ==
The American singer-songwriter Taylor Swift created her sixth studio album, Reputation, as a response to the controversies that blemished her once-wholesome "America's Sweetheart" reputation. It was released on November 10, 2017, by Big Machine Records; "Dancing with Our Hands Tied" is the eleventh track on the album. Swift wrote "Dancing with Our Hands Tied" with its producers: Max Martin, Shellback, and Oscar Holter. "Dancing with Our Hands Tied" has been certified platinum in Australia, gold in New Zealand, and silver in the UK.

== Music and lyrics ==
"Dancing with Our Hands Tied"
A sample of the song's pre-chorus leading to the refrain, accompanied by a bass drop. The electronic, beat-heavy production aligns with EDM and future bass.

At 3 minutes and 31 seconds, "Dancing with Our Hands Tied" is an electronic-heavy song, instrumented with propelling beats and an EDM and future bass refrain. The track features influences of various British dance and club genres, such as dubstep, 2-step garage, UK garage, drum and bass, and house music. The song is composed in the key of C minor, set over a fast tempo of 160 beats per minute. The production of the verses incorporates piano chords, an understated synth bass and percolating synth arpeggiators, and the refrain is accompanied by a bass drop. After the bridge, Swift uses the upper register of her vocal range, reaching F5 and G5 successively.

Rolling Stone's Rob Sheffield wrote that the track's implementation of 1980s-styled beats were similar to A-ha's "Take On Me" (1984), and The Independent's Roisin O'Connor opined that the production was reminiscent of Don Henley's "The Boys of Summer" (1984) and Robyn's "Dancing on My Own" (2010). Alexis Petridis of The Guardian likened the track's sound to the "AOR-inspired sound" of Swift's previous album 1989 (2014), while Kitty Empire of The Observer deemed the EDM refrain "ravey", and O'Connor thought that the dubstep and garage production resembled Swift's 2012 single "I Knew You Were Trouble". The music critic Annie Zaleski opined that "Dancing with Our Hands Tied", with its "moody" atmosphere and 1980s synthwave homage, served as the precedent to the Weeknd's "Blinding Lights" (2019), a track also co-produced by Oscar Holter.

In "Dancing with Our Hands Tied", Swift's narrator details a romantic relationship that serves as a refuge for her amidst catastrophes like wildfires and floods, but she is anxious that this low-profile relationship would be exposed to the outer world. This romance happens when the narrator was 25 years old, and she alludes to how the lover turns her bed "into a sacred oasis". She is aware of the public perception on her romance: "I loved you in spite of deep fears that the world would divide us." Refinery29's Elena Nicolaou noted that the song lyrically resembles "Slow Dancing in a Burning Room" (2006) by John Mayer; she noted that both of the song's choruses are about "people intimately dancing through a doomed situation" and that the lyric, "Swaying as the room burned down", creates a lyrical parallel to Mayer's song. Sheffield thought that the narrative resembled Romeo and Juliet more than Swift's 2008 single "Love Story" did.

== Reception and live performances ==
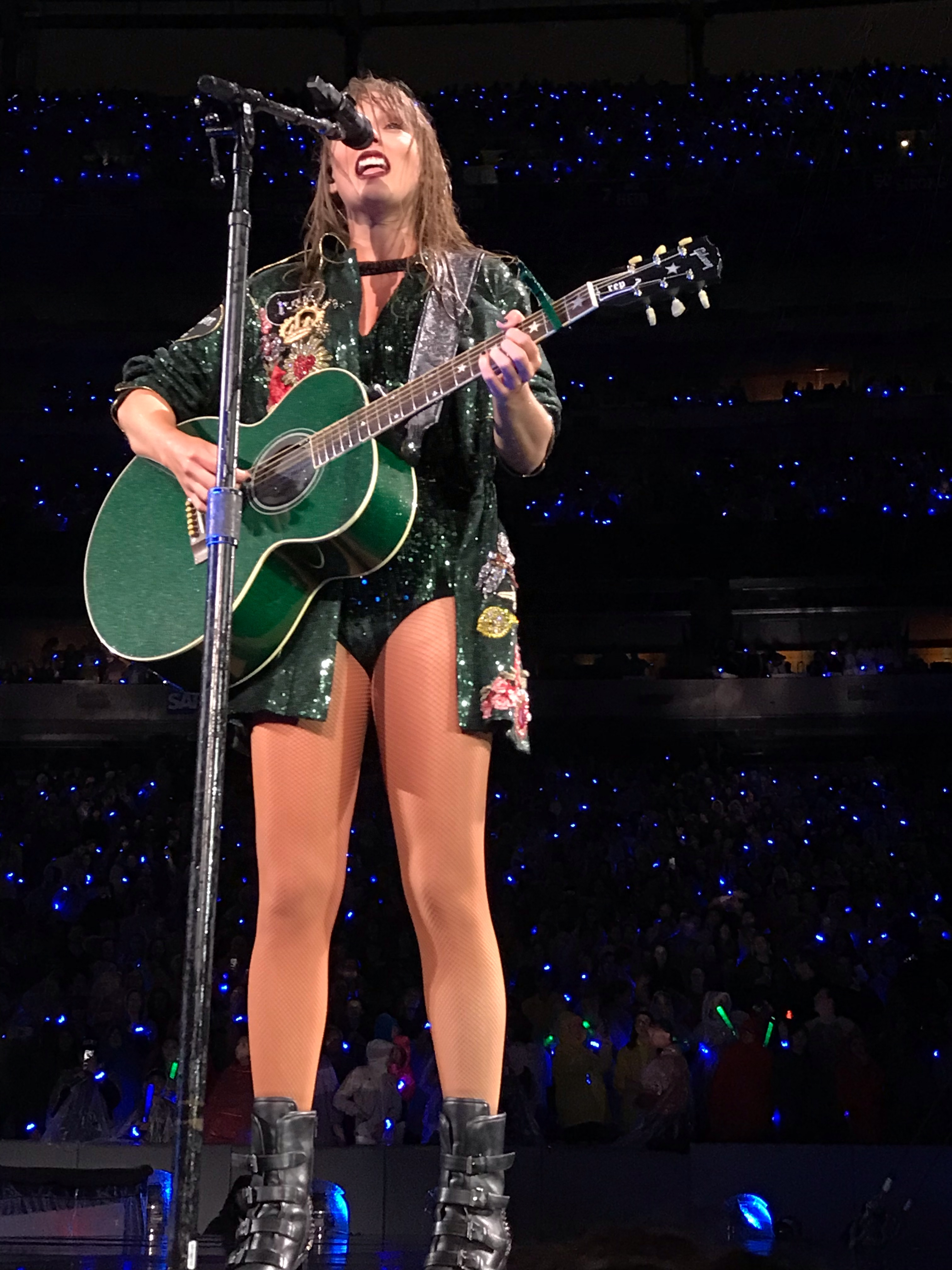
Swift performed "Dancing with Our Hands Tied" as an acoustic number on her 2018 Reputation Stadium Tour.

There were positive reviews of "Dancing with Our Hands Tied", particularly for its production. Petridis and Under the Radar's Ellen Peirson-Hagger selected the track as one of the Reputation songs that showcased Swift as a skilled pop songwriter. The A.V. Club's Clayton Purdom highlighted the "massive, laser-light chorus", while Joe Goggins of Drowned in Sound opined that the track was in line with modern trends in popular music, accompanied by Swift's "consistent cool detachment to [her] vocal delivery" that made it different from her past music. State's Nick Heatherington commented that the track is "more traditional" and "drives along at a leisurely pace". The writer and musician Kev Nickells opined that the production was sophisticated, with a "highly complex, very produced beat" and a stronger focus on rhythm in the arrangement, compared to Swift's previous pop songs. Zaleski highlighted Swift's agile vocal performance, portraying "from optimistic and concerned [to] anguished" moods that accompany the "intrigue-filled music". O'Connor praised the beat as "excellent" but opined that the refrain was "clunky in a way that holds the song back".

Other reviews commented on the lyricism. Peirson-Hagger wrote that the lyrics showcased Swift's romanticism that was in contrast with the "bad girl" image that the other Reputation tracks postulate. Pitchfork's Jamieson Cox picked the track as one of the examples of Reputation where Swift writes about sexually explicit themes. O'Connor highlighted the vulnerability in the song, deeming it an example of how Swift could capture feelings and small moments in her songwriting. Sheffield ranked "Dancing with Our Hands Tied" 195 out of 286 songs in Swift's entire discography as of October 2025; he wrote that the line, "I'm a mess, but I'm the mess that you wanted", evoked the "saddest line" that Fiona Apple had written ("I know I'm a mess he don't wanna clean up").

On the Reputation Stadium Tour, Swift performed "Dancing with Our Hands Tied" as an acoustic number on guitar. Variety's Chris Willman wrote that the acoustic rendition proved that the song "worked as well acoustically without the Max Martin-izing", while The Guardian's Bog Gordon commented that the acoustic performance "seemed heartening and important [...] as these were moments that focussed on the talented artist rather than the showbusiness of it all". She also performed it twice as a "surprise song" during her next concert tour, the Eras Tour (2023–2024): on guitar at the second Rio de Janeiro concert on November 19, 2023; and on guitar in a mashup with "The Albatross" (2024) at the second Dublin concert on June 29, 2024.

== Personnel ==
Credits adapted from the liner notes of Reputation

- Taylor Swift – lead vocals, backing vocals, songwriting
- Max Martin – producer, programming, songwriting, keyboard
- Shellback – producer, programming, songwriting, keyboard
- Oscar Holter – producer, programming, songwriting, keyboard, piano
- Sam Holland – engineering
- Michael Ilbert – engineering
- Cory Bice – assistant engineering
- Jeremy Lertola – assistant engineering
- Serban Ghenea – mixing

== Certifications ==
| Region | Certification | Certified units/sales |
|---|---|---|
| Australia (ARIA) | Platinum | 70,000^{‡} |
| New Zealand (RMNZ) | Gold | 15,000^{‡} |
| United Kingdom (BPI) | Silver | 200,000^{‡} |
^{‡} Sales+streaming figures based on certification alone.
