= List of top 10 singles for 2017 in Australia =

This is a list of singles that charted in the top ten of the ARIA Charts in 2017. In 2017, twenty-seven acts reached the top ten for the first time.

== Top-ten singles ==
Key

Symbol	Meaning
◁	Indicates single's top 10 entry was also its ARIA top 50 debut
(#)	2017 Year-end top 10 single position and rank

List of ARIA top ten singles that peaked in 2017
Top ten entry date	Single	Artist(s)	Peak	Peak date	Weeks in top ten	References
Singles from 2016
12 December	"Stranger"	Peking Duk featuring Elliphant	5	9 January	6	
Singles from 2017
9 January	"I Feel It Coming"	The Weeknd featuring Daft Punk	7	9 January	6	
9 January	"Call on Me" ^{[B]}	Starley	8	9 January	3	
9 January	"Fresh Eyes"	Andy Grammer	5	16 January	7	
16 January	"Shape of You" (#1) ◁	Ed Sheeran	1	16 January	24	
16 January	"Castle on the Hill" (#3) ◁	Ed Sheeran	2	16 January	13	
16 January	"Play That Song"	Train	8	16 January	1	
23 January	"Paris" ◁	The Chainsmokers	4	30 January	7	
23 January	"Chameleon"	Pnau	4	6 February	7	
6 February	"Adore"	Amy Shark	3	6 February	4	
6 February	"Cocoon"	Milky Chance	10	6 February	1	
13 February	"Issues"	Julia Michaels	5	27 February	8	
20 February	"Chained to the Rhythm" ◁	Katy Perry featuring Skip Marley	4	20 February	3	
27 February	"How Would You Feel (Paean)" ◁	Ed Sheeran	2	27 February	1	
27 February	"It Ain't Me" ◁	Kygo and Selena Gomez	4	6 March	9	
6 March	"Something Just like This" (#5) ◁	The Chainsmokers and Coldplay	2	6 March	12	
6 March	"All Time Low" ^{[C]}	Jon Bellion	9	6 March	3	
13 March	"Green Light" ◁	Lorde	4	13 March	8	
13 March	"Dive" ◁	Ed Sheeran	5	13 March	1	
13 March	"Perfect" (#4) ◁ ^{[I]}	Ed Sheeran and Beyoncé or Andrea Bocelli	1	11 December	25	
13 March	"Stay"	Zedd and Alessia Cara	3	3 April	10	
13 March	"Galway Girl" (#7) ◁	Ed Sheeran	2	10 April	15	
20 March	"That's What I Like"	Bruno Mars	5	3 April	6	
3 April	"Passionfruit"	Drake	4	3 April	2	
10 April	"HUMBLE." (#8) ◁	Kendrick Lamar	2	24 April	12	
17 April	"Sign of the Times" ◁	Harry Styles	1	17 April	7	
17 April	"Symphony"	Clean Bandit featuring Zara Larsson	4	1 May	9	
1 May	"There's Nothing Holdin' Me Back" (#10) ◁	Shawn Mendes	4	5 June	14	
1 May	"The Cure"	Lady Gaga	10	1 May	1	
8 May	"I'm the One" ◁	DJ Khaled featuring Justin Bieber, Quavo, Chance the Rapper and Lil Wayne	1	8 May	12	
8 May	"Despacito" (#2)	Luis Fonsi and Daddy Yankee featuring Justin Bieber	1	22 May	18	
22 May	"Malibu" ◁	Miley Cyrus	3	22 May	7	
29 May	"Slow Hands"	Niall Horan	2	10 July	12	
5 June	"Strip That Down"	Liam Payne featuring Quavo	2	26 June	13	
19 June	"2U" ◁ ^{[D]}	David Guetta featuring Justin Bieber	2	19 June	4	
26 June	"Wild Thoughts" ◁	DJ Khaled featuring Rihanna and Bryson Tiller	2	3 July	9	
3 July	"Mama"	Jonas Blue featuring William Singe	7	3 July	6	
3 July	"Attention" ^{[E]}	Charlie Puth	10	3 July	3	
10 July	"Thunder" (#6)	Imagine Dragons	2	31 July	14	
10 July	"Feels"	Calvin Harris featuring Pharrell Williams, Katy Perry and Big Sean	3	31 July	10	
31 July	"Glorious" (#9)	Macklemore featuring Skylar Grey	2	21 August	14	
7 August	"Praying"	Kesha	6	21 August	5	
7 August	"Body Like a Back Road"	Sam Hunt	9	14 August	3	
14 August	"Unforgettable"	French Montana featuring Swae Lee	7	14 August	5	
21 August	"What About Us" ◁ ^{[J]}	Pink	1	21 August	7	
28 August	"Friends" ◁	Justin Bieber and BloodPop	2	28 August	4	
28 August	"New Rules" ^{[L]}	Dua Lipa	2	25 September	14	
4 September	"Look What You Made Me Do" ◁	Taylor Swift	1	4 September	5	
11 September	"...Ready for It?" ◁	Taylor Swift	3	11 September	2	
11 September	"Sorry Not Sorry" ^{[G]}	Demi Lovato	8	11 September	2	
18 September	"Too Good at Goodbyes" ◁	Sam Smith	1	18 September	12	
18 September	"Dusk Till Dawn" ◁	Zayn featuring Sia	6	9 October	8	
18 September	"1-800-273-8255"	Logic featuring Alessia Cara and Khalid	5	2 October	4	
25 September	"Rockstar" ◁	Post Malone featuring 21 Savage	1	2 October	19	
25 September	"I Like Me Better"	Lauv	8	2 October	2	
9 October	"Havana"	Camila Cabello featuring Young Thug	1	20 November	17	
9 October	"Young Dumb & Broke"	Khalid	4	30 October	11	
16 October	"Feel It Still" ^{[M]}	Portugal. The Man	5	30 October	8	
16 October	"Good Old Days" ^{[K]}	Macklemore featuring Kesha	8	6 November	2	
30 October	"Gorgeous" ◁	Taylor Swift	9	30 October	1	
13 November	"What Lovers Do"	Maroon 5 featuring SZA	7	13 November	5	
13 November	"Silence"	Marshmello featuring Khalid	5	11 December	13	
20 November	"Wolves"	Selena Gomez and Marshmello	5	27 November	9	
20 November	"Walk on Water" ◁	Eminem featuring Beyoncé	10	20 November	1	
11 December	"Let You Down"	NF	7	11 December	10	
25 December	"River" ◁	Eminem featuring Ed Sheeran	2	25 December	12	

=== 2002 peaks ===
List of ARIA top ten singles in 2017 that peaked in 2002
Top ten entry date	Single	Artist(s)	Peak	Peak date	Weeks in top ten	References
6 January	"In the End" ^{[F]}	Linkin Park	4	3 February	7	

=== 2013 peaks ===
List of ARIA top ten singles in 2017 that peaked in 2013
Top ten entry date	Single	Artist(s)	Peak	Peak date	Weeks in top ten	References
14 January	"Same Love" ^{[H]}	Macklemore & Ryan Lewis featuring Mary Lambert	1	21 January	10	

=== 2016 peaks ===
List of ARIA top ten singles in 2017 that peaked in 2016
Top ten entry date	Single	Artist(s)	Peak	Peak date	Weeks in top ten	References
16 May	"Can't Stop the Feeling!" ◁ ^{[A]}	Justin Timberlake	3	23 May	14	
8 August	"Closer" ◁	The Chainsmokers featuring Halsey	1	15 August	23	
3 October	"Say You Won't Let Go"	James Arthur	1	17 October	15	
3 October	"Starboy" ◁	The Weeknd featuring Daft Punk	2	17 October	18	
24 October	"24K Magic"	Bruno Mars	3	26 December	13	
14 November	"Sexual"	Neiked featuring Dyo	4	21 November	8	
21 November	"Black Beatles"	Rae Sremmurd featuring Gucci Mane	3	28 November	7	
28 November	"Rockabye"	Clean Bandit featuring Sean Paul and Anne-Marie	1	5 December	13	
19 December	"I Don't Wanna Live Forever" ◁	Zayn and Taylor Swift	3	19 December	12	

=== 2018 peaks ===
List of ARIA top ten singles in 2017 that peaked in 2018
Top ten entry date	Single	Artist(s)	Peak	Peak date	Weeks in top ten	References
6 November	"I Fall Apart"	Post Malone	2	15 January	19	
11 December	"Meant to Be"	Bebe Rexha featuring Florida Georgia Line	2	29 January	16	

Notes:

^{A} The single re-entered the top 10 on 2 January 2017.
^{B} The single re-entered the top 10 on 23 January 2017.
^{C} The single re-entered the top 10 on 20 March 2017.
^{D} The single re-entered the top 10 on 17 July 2017.
^{E} The single re-entered the top 10 on 24 July 2017.
^{F} The single re-entered the top 10 on 31 July 2017.
^{G} The single re-entered the top 10 on 2 October 2017.
^{H} The single re-entered the top 10 on 9 October 2017.
^{I} The single re-entered the top 10 on 16 October 2017.
^{J} The single re-entered the top 10 on 23 October 2017.
^{K} The single re-entered the top 10 on 6 November 2017.
^{L} The single re-entered the top 10 on 27 November 2017.
^{M} The single re-entered the top 10 on 18 December 2017.

== Entries by artist ==
The following table shows artists who achieved two or more top 10 entries in 2017, including songs that reached their peak in 2016 and 2018. The figures include both main artists and featured artists. The total number of weeks an artist spent in the top ten in 2017 is also shown.

Entries	Artist	Weeks	Songs
7	Ed Sheeran	35	"Castle on the Hill", "Dive", "Galway Girl", "How Would You Feel (Paean)", "Perfect", "River", "Shape of You"
4	Justin Bieber	20	"2U", "Despacito", "Friends", "I'm the One"
4	Taylor Swift	16	"Gorgeous", "I Don't Wanna Live Forever", "Look What You Made Me Do", "...Ready for It?"
3	The Chainsmokers	20	"Closer", "Paris", "Something Just Like This"
3	Khalid	15	"1-800-273-8255", "Silence", "Young Dumb & Broke"
3	Macklemore	15	"Glorious", "Good Old Days", "Same Love"
2	Alessia Cara	14	"1-800-273-8255", "Stay"
2	Beyoncé	4	"Perfect", "Walk on Water"
2	Bruno Mars	9	"24K Magic", "That's What I Like"
2	Clean Bandit	17	"Rockabye", "Symphony"
2	Daft Punk	7	"I Feel It Coming", "Starboy"
2	DJ Khaled	16	"I'm the One", "Wild Thoughts"
2	Eminem	2	"River", "Walk on Water"
2	Katy Perry	13	"Chained to the Rhythm", "Feels"
2	Kesha	7	"Good Old Days", "Praying"
2	Marshmello	7	"Silence", "Wolves"
2	Post Malone	14	"I Fall Apart", "Rockstar"
2	Quavo	17	"I'm the One", "Strip That Down"
2	Selena Gomez	15	"It Ain't Me", "Wolves"
2	Swae Lee (includes songs as part of Rae Sremmurd)	6	"Black Beatles", "Unforgettable"
2	The Weeknd	7	"I Feel It Coming", "Starboy"
2	Zayn	18	"Dusk Till Dawn", "I Don't Wanna Live Forever"

== See also ==
- 2017 in music
- ARIA Charts
- List of number-one singles of 2017 (Australia)
- List of top 10 albums in 2017 (Australia)
