= Reputation Stadium Tour =

2018 concert tour by Taylor Swift

- Tour by Taylor Swift
- Promotional poster for the tour
- Location: Australia; Canada; England; Ireland; Japan; New Zealand; United States
- Associated album: Reputation
- Start date: May 8, 2018
- End date: November 21, 2018
- No. of shows: 53
- Supporting acts: Broods; Camila Cabello; Charli XCX
- Attendance: 2.88 million
- Box office: $345.6 million (Note: $443.11 million in 2025 dollars.)

Taylor Swift concert chronology
- The 1989 World Tour (2015); Reputation Stadium Tour (2018); The Eras Tour (2023–2024)

The Reputation Stadium Tour was the fifth concert tour and the first all-stadium tour by the American singer-songwriter Taylor Swift, in support of her sixth studio album, Reputation (2017). It began in Glendale, Arizona, United States, on May 8, 2018, and concluded in Tokyo, Japan, on November 21, 2018. The tour encompassed 53 shows and visited 7 countries in total.

The set list consisted mostly of the songs from Reputation and some from Swift's other albums. The stage incorporated prominent snake motifs and imagery as decoration, reflecting the album's concept and Swift's public image. The main stage had a wedge-shaped display resembling a skyscraper under construction and was equipped with elaborate lighting, and two smaller B-stages were used for acoustic “surprise song” performances. The October 6, 2018, show at AT&T Stadium in Arlington, Texas, was recorded and released as a Netflix original concert film on December 31, 2018; it has since been removed from Netflix for unknown reasons.

Music critics commented that the production evoked Goth subculture and Broadway theatricality, praising the stage design, production, and wardrobe. They lauded Swift's showmanship and interactions with her audience that brought forth an exhilarating yet intimate experience. The Reputation Stadium Tour received 2.88 million attendees and grossed $345.6 million, becoming the highest-grossing US and North American tour upon completion. It was awarded Tour of the Year at the People's Choice Awards, American Music Awards, and iHeartRadio Music Awards.

== Background and development ==
Taylor Swift begаn the promotional cycle for her 2017 studio album Reputation with the release of the lead single "Look What You Made Me Do" on August 24. Concurrently, as reported by Billboard, Swift partnered with Ticketmaster for a "Verified Fan" program to prevent bots and ticket scalpers from purchasing concert tickets. The program, named "Taylor Swift Tix", allowed fans to purchase tickets in advance of the public on-sale by participating in activities such as buying Swift's music, streaming her videos, and engaging in miscellaneous "unique activities" to increase chances of getting a pre-sale access code. Reputation was released on November 10, 2017, to immediate commercial success: within first week of release, it sold over one million copies in the US and two million copies worldwide.

On November 13, 2017, Swift's management announced the first 27 dates across the US of the Reputation Stadium Tour; tickets went on sale to the general public on December 13. On November 27, Swift announced the first three UK dates. Two days later, thanks to overwhelming demand even before pre-sale began, Swift announced nine additional dates—three for the UK, five for the US, and one for Canada. On December 3, Swift announced five dates for Australasia. In January 2018, due to high demand, Swift added second dates in Santa Clara, Landover, Philadelphia, Minneapolis and Arlington and third dates in East Rutherford and Foxborough, totaling 40 shows for the tour's North American leg.

On March 1, 2018, Swift officially announced Camila Cabello and Charli XCX as the opening acts for the Reputation Stadium Tour. Cabello was previously speculated as the opening act as the shows for her Never Be the Same Tour did not coincide with Swift's tour dates; Portland's Live 95.5 also announced her in a sweepstake for the concert of June 22, 2018, at Wembley Stadium in London through a since-deleted post on Twitter, one day before Swift confirmed her as the opening act.

On May 7, 2018, the day before the tour kicked off at Glendale, Arizona, Swift invited 2,000 foster and adopted children to a private dress rehearsal. The following day, she announced two shows in Tokyo in partnership with Fujifilm Instax, with Charli XCX as the opening act. In September, Broods was announced as an opening act for the Oceania leg of the tour.

During the shows, Swift performed "surprise songs" as part of an acoustic segment at different concerts. The songs varied by venue and were taken from Swift's back catalog. A streaming-exclusive compilation playlist, Reputation Stadium Tour Surprise Song Playlist, was released to digital music platforms on November 30, 2018. The playlist was certified triple platinum in Brazil.

== Critical reception ==
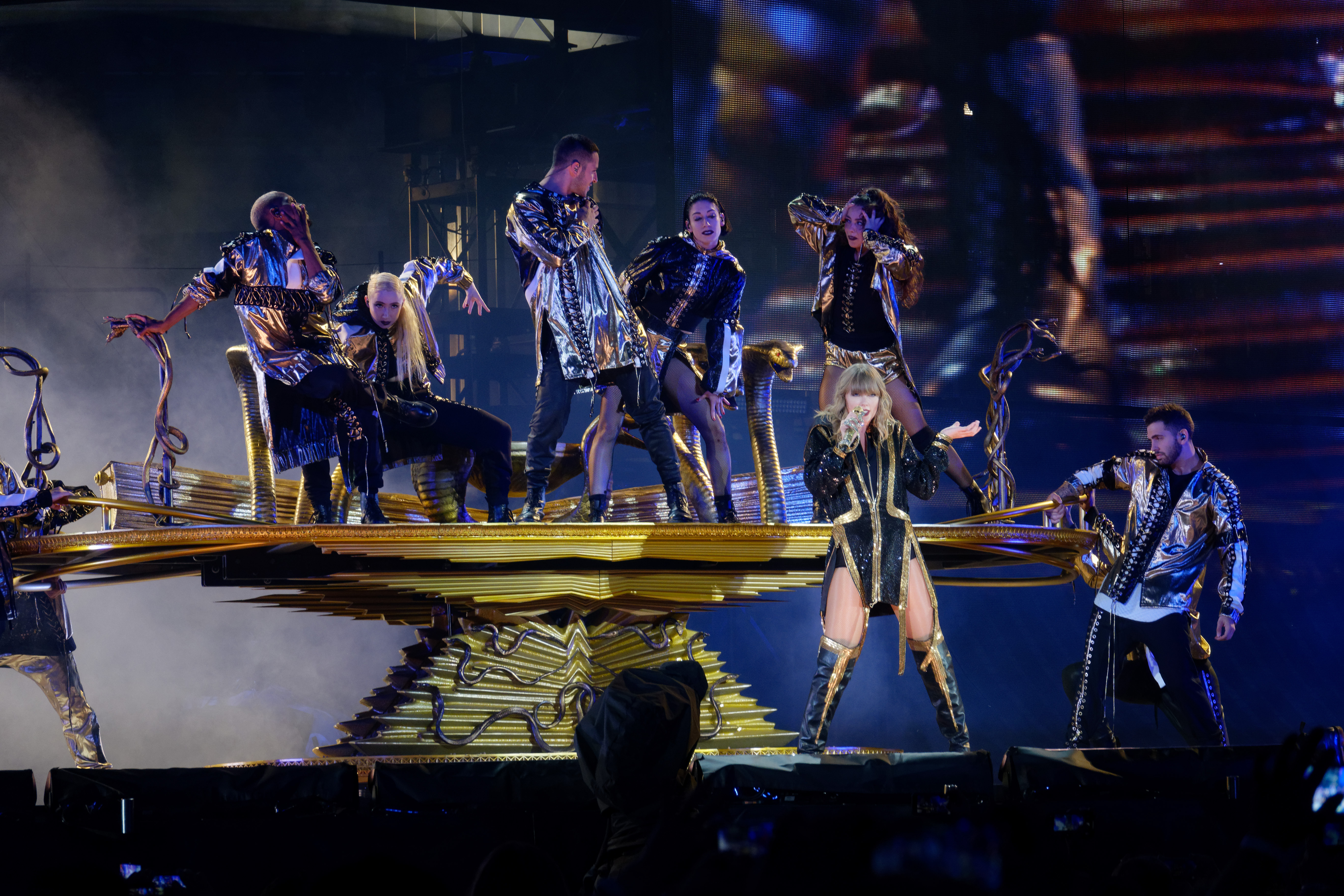
Swift performing "Look What You Made Me Do" with background dancers on a tilted stage with golden snake decorations

Media publications and journalists gave the tour rave reviews and many of them deemed it one of the best tours of 2018. The concerts were complimented for Swift's on-stage persona and intimacy with the audience, the versatile set list and the transition between songs, production value, the stripped-down performances and wardrobe choices, with many commentators noting the Gothic visuals and costumes and Broadway theatricality of the show.

Stereogum's Chris DeVille deemed it a "hyper-maximalist" tour and "a perpetual gargantuan flex, a roving musical Infinity War that amplifies everything extra about her persona to an exponential scope" and added that it is designed to be "the biggest spectacle in all of summer entertainment". He also described the tour as "an oversized, high-tech touring Broadway production with a mostly tremendous soundtrack" and concluded that "when discussing the biggest artists of her [Swift's] generation, she's undeniably on the shortlist" and that the singer has ascended to the same "rarefied" tier as the "classic rock deities who've echoed across this venue [the Horseshoe] before her, able to keep commanding stadium status for the rest of her career". Rob Sheffield of Rolling Stone named the tour as Swift's "most astounding tour yet" and complimented it for giving "it all the vibe of a mass communion" despite aiming for "maximum stadium-rock razzle-dazzle bombast". He observed the acoustic performances of Swift's fan-favorite deep cuts and dubbed them "a powerhouse performance that made all the different Taylors sound like part of the same story".

The Guardian's Bob Gordon thought that "...Ready for It?" is "an appropriate and compelling opener". He opined that Swift made a "striking entrance" with "no elevation or descent, simply walking out from behind a curtain bathed in brilliant white light, in what was a real 'now I'm here' moment, as Freddie Mercury would once have put it". Awarding the tour five stars, Roisin O'Connor of The Independent lauded the set-list and how it "transitions seamlessly from one song to another, crafted out of some of the best from Swift's canon". Also, she compared the tour to a Broadway show because the stage was "flooded with red lighting and dancers swing from trapeze with all the splendour of a Broadway show". Lydia Burgham of The Spinoff defined the tour's Auckland concert a "theatrical, mega-production that somehow also strips down to raw intimate moments". Commenting on the set list, she noted that Swift "had the crowd aching for more with the commencement of every song, thanks to seamless transitions". Burgham highlighted the intimacy of Swift's acoustic guitar and piano performances that proved Swift remained "integral to her singer-songwriter origins". Burgham summarized her review by stating that "there may not be an artist in this lifetime who quite manages to connect to thousands of people on a rainy night as well as Taylor Swift can – and that's the reputation she will be remembered for".

Variety's Chris Willman wrote that the show "had plenty of fierceness, especially in the early going" but also the "pre-decedent Taylor on the line… the guileless Swift we remember from two or three skins ago", and commended Swift for using her two hours on the stage to "paint a rewardingly holistic picture". Willman believed that, despite the huge production, "we're still left not so much with dragons or defensiveness but in the endearingly earnest presence of pop's most approachable superstar". He further remarked that the acoustic performance of "Dancing with Our Hands Tied" proved that Reputation worked acoustically as well, without the "Max Martin-izing". Randy Lewis of Los Angeles Times wrote that Swift gave "a master class in the constructive use of the modern technology that's allowed her to establish and nurture an exceptionally powerful connection with a massive audience." He underlined the use of light-up bracelets that allowed the attendees "to feel like participants, even collaborators, rather than passive observers" and appreciated the stage's resemblance to "a skyscraper in progress, with six crane-like contraptions stretching up above a wedge-like screen". Lewis summarized the show as "tightly structured for the most part, featuring elaborate production numbers that rely on video projection, eye-popping lighting and pyrotechnics, choreography and precisely coordinated interaction among the star, band, singers and dancers".

Reviewing for V magazine, Greg Krelenstein stated that Swift possesses "a rare gift of turning a stadium spectacle into an intimate setting", with the new persona the singer adopted on Reputation album cycle suiting itself "excellently to a show of this magnitude where she appears larger than life". He thought that Swift fully embraced her vast back catalog and praised her command of the stage—"whether plucking a guitar or leading an army of dancers" that showed that Swift's musical and performance evolution is an "absolute success". Krelenstein concluded that the pop star "delivers in every way to a mesmerized and devoted audience, re-defining what the modern stadium tour can be". Ed Masley of The Arizona Republic wrote that "there were many moments in the course Swift's performance that felt like she was playing to the back rows of the stadium by simply sharing with her fans", while complimenting the tour's production and Swift's connection with the crowd. Jim Harrington of The Mercury News asserted that the singer's vocal work and performance skills have improved over the years, and added that "her game is well-rounded enough that she can excel equally at every different aspect of the show." Chris Tuite of CBS San Francisco wrote: "The only thing more prominent than the singer herself during her current costume-change filled spectacle are the massive, vicious looking snakes that symbolically appear throughout the set." Michael Tritsch of 303 magazine raved that the tour "broke new ground and set the bar high for future stadium tours", burning "its way into the history books".

== Commercial performance ==
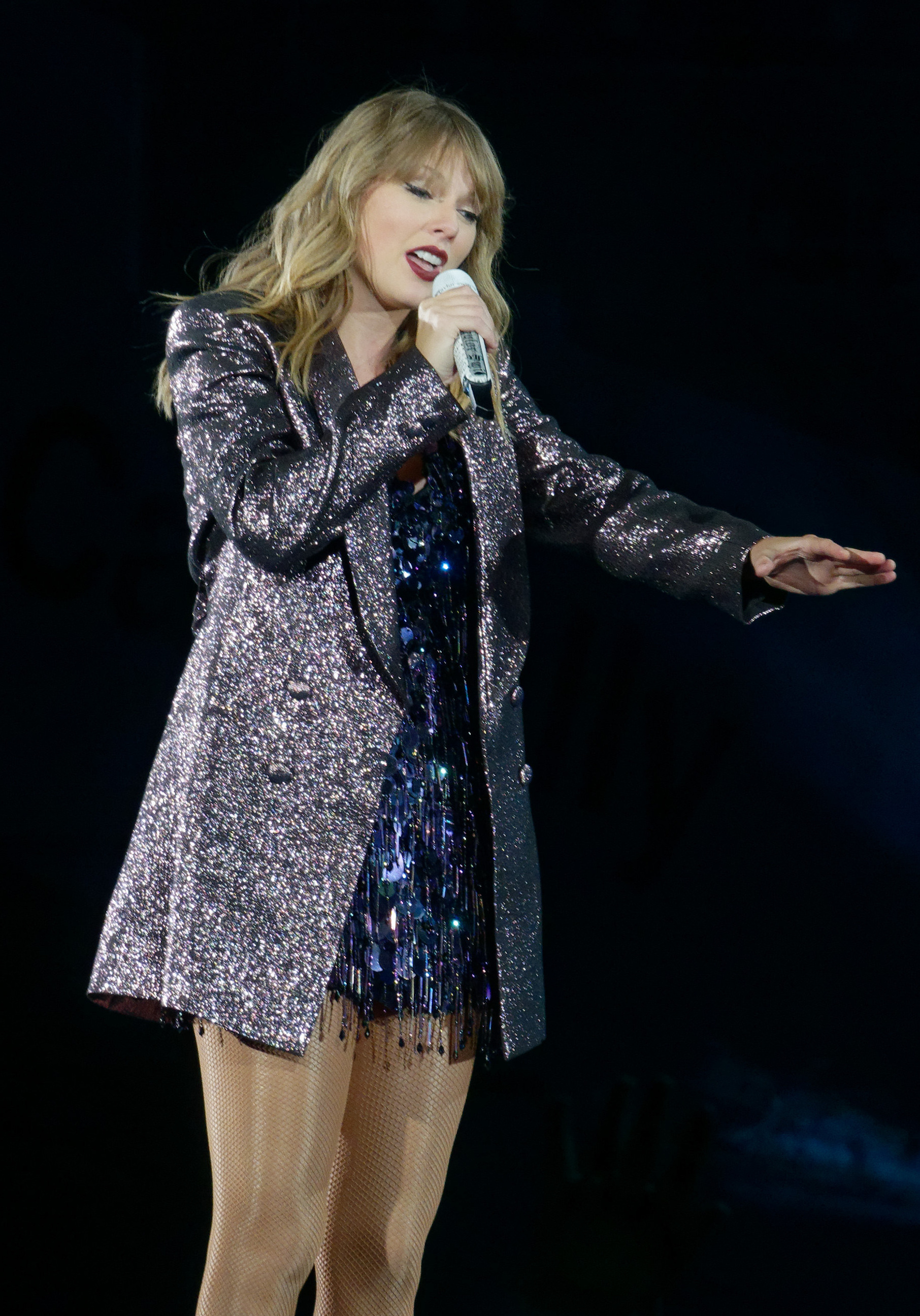
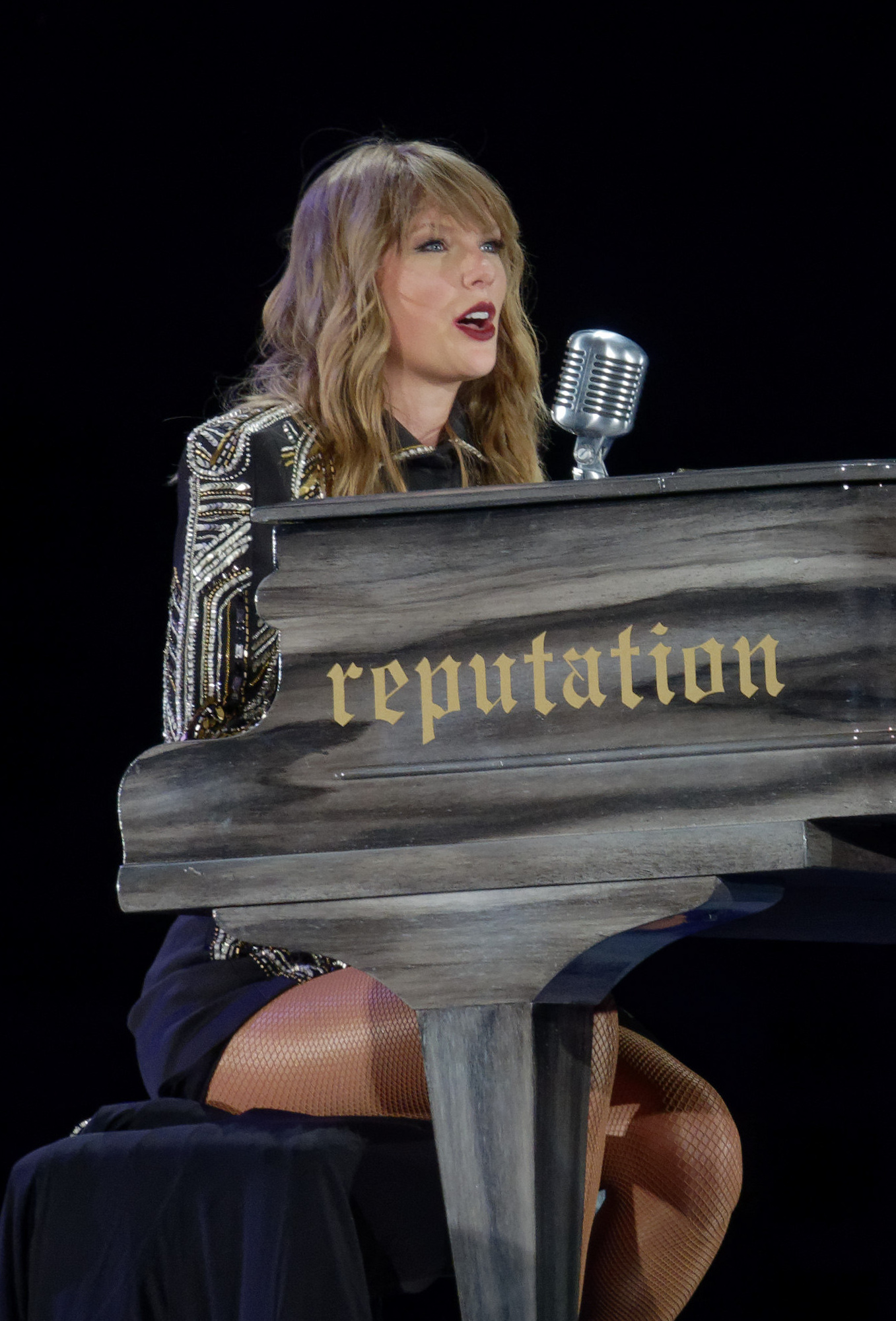
Swift broke many ticket sales and revenue records, including one at CenturyLink Field in Seattle (performance pictured).

=== Ticket sales ===
After four days of sales through the Verified Fan platform and three days of sales to the general public that began December 13, the tour had already grossed $180 million from 33 dates in North America alone. Pollstar reported data supplied by the Gridiron Stadium Network, a consortium of NFL facilities that work together to book concerts at their buildings, which showed at least 35,000 tickets had been sold at ten of the stadiums on the route as of December 18. The tickets sold ranged from 35,419 at Heinz Field in Pittsburgh to a high of 48,039 at Lincoln Financial Field in Philadelphia. With more than 47,000 tickets sold, it was reported the May 12, 2018, date at Levi's Stadium in Santa Clara was generating close to $9 million in ticket revenue, which prompted the addition of an extra date.

According to StubHub, the tour is the best-selling female tour in the United Kingdom in 2018.

=== Boxscore ===
The first seven shows of the tour grossed $54 million with 390,000 tickets sold, leading Swift to the top of Billboard's Hot Tours chart in June 2018. She performed to sold-out crowds of 59,157 in Glendale and 107,550 in Santa Clara (over two nights), grossing $7.21 million and $14 million respectively, while the Pasadena shows combined for a gross of nearly $16.3 million and Seattle accounted more than $8.6 million. The concerts in Louisville and Columbus, reported in July 2018, grossed $11.5 million with around 115,000 tickets sold, with the latter city having the highest gross and most tickets sold, with approximately 63,000 tickets and $6.6 million. These concerts led the singer once again to the top of Hot Tours chart.

== Records ==
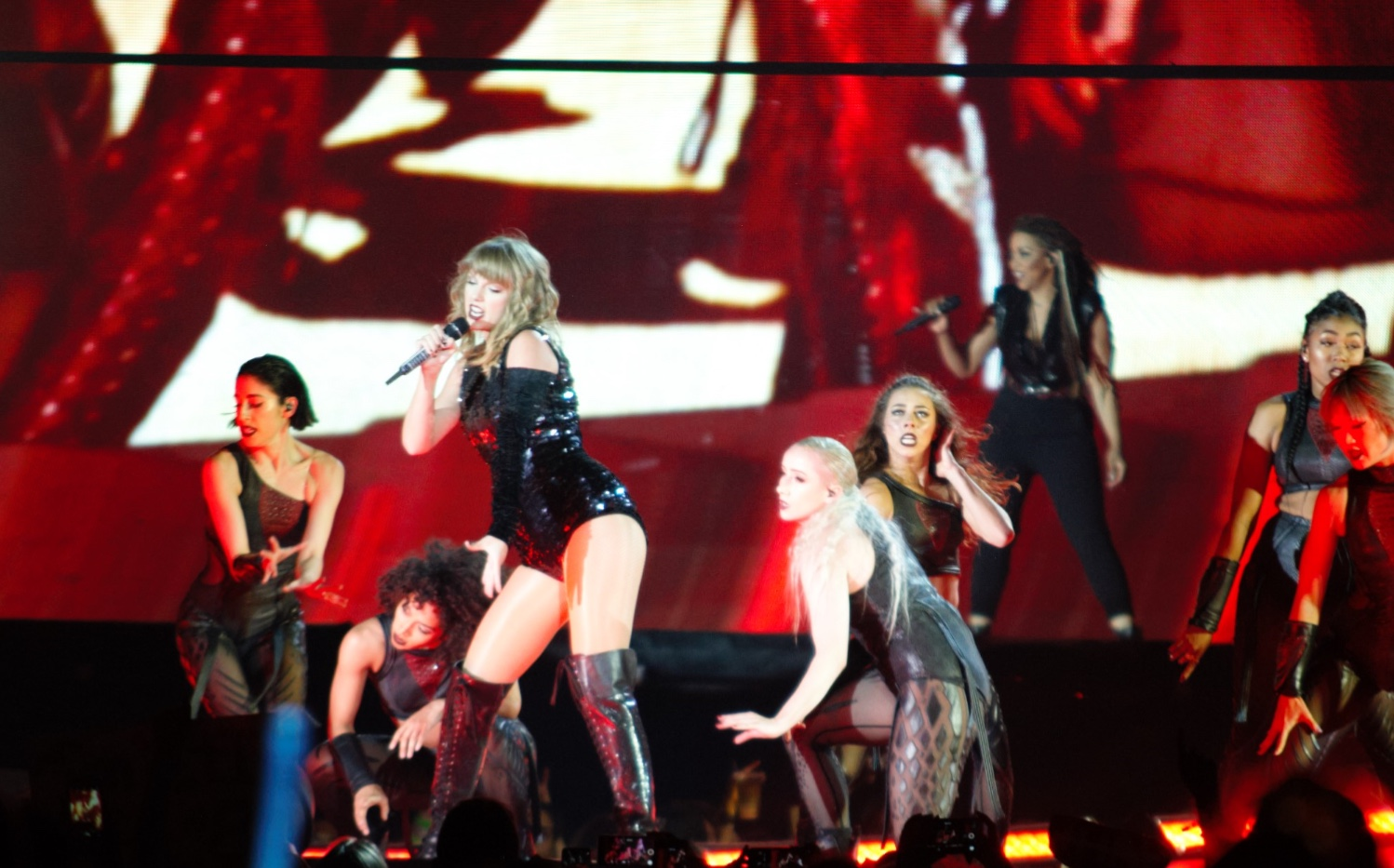
Swift performing at Sports Authority Field at Mile High in Denver, Colorado, where she became the first woman to headline a concert at that stadium

The tour broke multiple venue attendance and grossing records. The opening show at University of Phoenix Stadium set new venue records in both gross and attendance, topping Metallica's $5.2 million gross from August 2017 by almost $2 million. With 59,157 tickets sold, Swift also broke the attendance record set by One Direction on their Where We Are Tour in 2014 by 2,633 seats. With a $14 million take from 107,550 sold tickets at Levi's Stadium, she topped her own gross and attendance counts set during the 1989 World Tour in 2015. With more than 118,000 fans in attendance at the Rose Bowl, the two-show run earned $16.2 million and set a new gross record for a single headliner at the venue, surpassing U2's 2017 record by over $467,000. Grossing records previously set by U2 as well were broken at Seattle's CenturyLink Field, where she topped their Joshua Tree Tour 2017 gross by $2.4 million, and Denver's Sports Authority Field at Mile High, where she surpassed the $6.6 million gross set by the band in 2011 during their 360° Tour by $1.2 million.

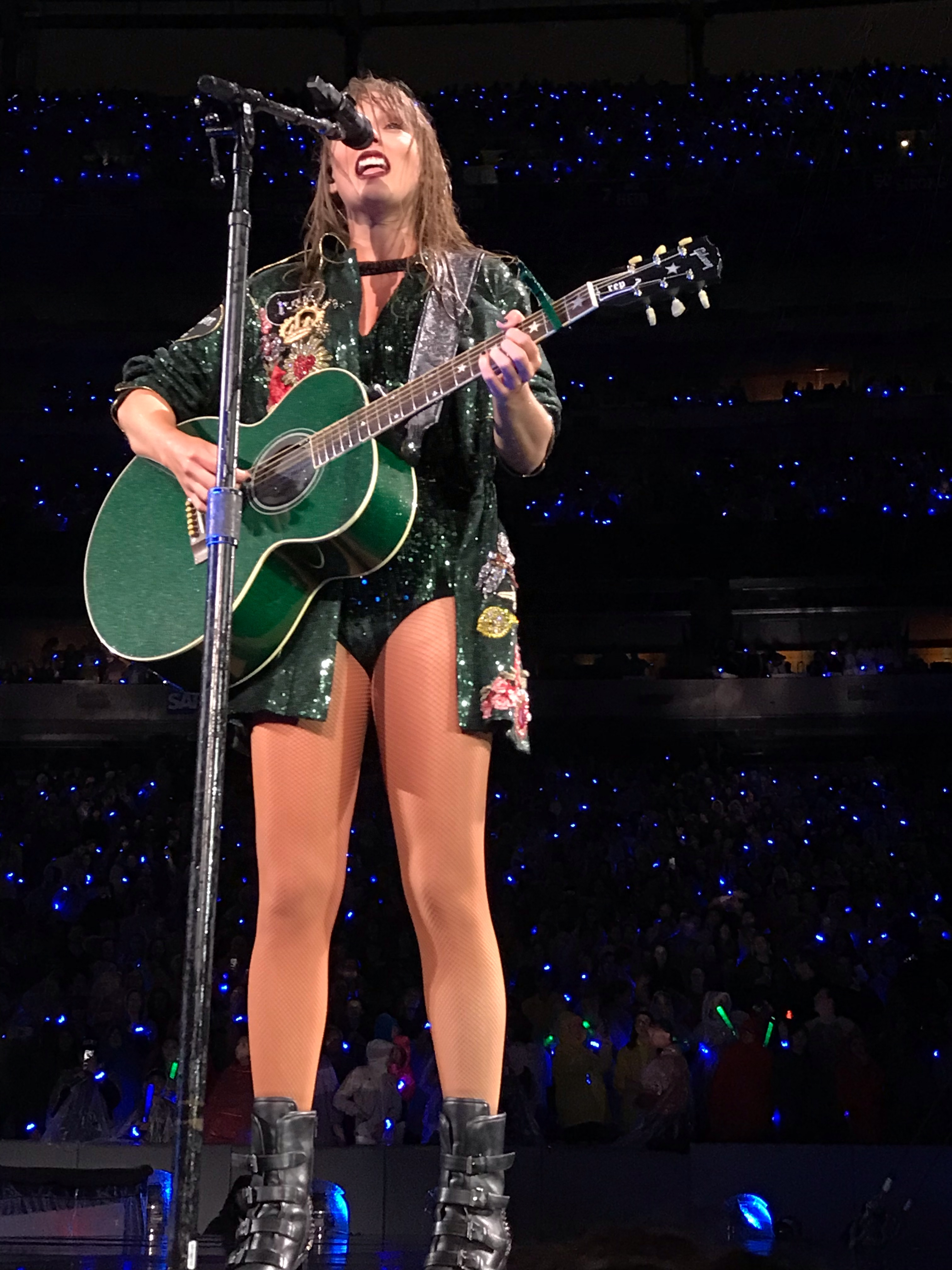
Swift performing at MetLife Stadium where she became the first female artist in history to headline and sell out three consecutive shows at the stadium

Swift made history by becoming the first ever female artist to headline Dublin's Croke Park twice, with reportedly 136,000 fans in attendance. Similarly, she became the first woman to headline three consecutive nights at MetLife Stadium and Gillette Stadium.

Following the 29th show in North America at Hard Rock Stadium in Miami, the tour had grossed $202.3 million in the continent ($191.1 million in the United States and $11.1 million in Canada), thus breaking Swift's own record of the highest-grossing North American tour by a female artist, previously held by the 1989 World Tour, with fewer dates. The tour eventually broke the overall record set by the Rolling Stones' A Bigger Bang Tour to become the highest-grossing tour in US and North American history, grossing $266.1 million, besting the Rolling Stones' $245 million gross. The Rolling Stones achieved their then-record from 70 American shows, while Swift did so with just 38 shows. Additionally, the Reputation Stadium Tour holds the Guinness World Record for 2018's highest-grossing tour by a female artist.

=== Venue records ===
List of venue records
Dates (2018)	Venue	Country	Description
May 8	University of Phoenix Stadium	United States	First female act to headline the venue
May 8	University of Phoenix Stadium	United States	Highest gross ($7.2 million)
May 11–12	Levi's Stadium	United States	Highest gross ($14 million)
May 11–12	Levi's Stadium	United States	Biggest two-day attendance
May 18–19	Rose Bowl	United States	First female act to headline one and two shows on a single tour
May 18–19	Rose Bowl	United States	Highest gross ($100 million)
May 22	CenturyLink Field	United States	Highest gross ($8.6 million)
May 25	Sports Authority Field at Mile High	United States	First female act to headline the venue
May 25	Sports Authority Field at Mile High	United States	Highest gross ($7.9 million)
June 8–9	Etihad Stadium	England	First female act to headline one and two shows on a single tour
June 15–16	Croke Park	Ireland	First female act to headline two consecutive shows on a single tour
June 30	Cardinal Stadium	United States	First female act to headline the venue
June 30	Cardinal Stadium	United States	Biggest single-day attendance
July 7	Ohio Stadium	United States	First female act to headline the venue
July 10–11	FedExField	United States	First female act to headline one and two shows on a single tour
July 20–22	Gillette Stadium	United States	First female act to headline three consecutive shows on a single tour
July 26–27	MetLife Stadium	United States	First female act to headline three consecutive shows on a single tour
August 7	Heinz Field	United States	Biggest single-day attendance
August 10–11	Mercedes-Benz Stadium	United States	First female act to headline the venue
August 10–11	Mercedes-Benz Stadium	United States	First act to headline two consecutive shows on a single tour
August 14	Raymond James Stadium	United States	Highest gross ($7.2 million)
August 18	Hard Rock Stadium	United States	Highest gross ($7 million)
August 25	Nissan Stadium	United States	Highest gross ($9 million)
August 28	Ford Field	United States	Highest gross ($6.5 million)
August 31 – September 1	U.S. Bank Stadium	United States	First female act to headline the venue
August 31 – September 1	U.S. Bank Stadium	United States	First act to headline two consecutive shows on a single tour
September 15	Lucas Oil Stadium	United States	First female act to headline the venue
September 15	Lucas Oil Stadium	United States	Biggest single-day attendance
September 18	The Dome at America's Center	United States	Highest gross ($4.8 million)
October 5–6	AT&T Stadium	United States	First act to headline two consecutive shows on a single tour

== Accolades ==
=== Honor ===
Mark Dayton, Governor of Minnesota (2011–2019), declared August 31, 2018, as "Taylor Swift Day" in the state in honor of Swift's two shows (August 31 and September 1) at the United States Bank Stadium in Minneapolis. He remarked that "through her personal and honest music, Taylor Swift has energized and inspired not only Minnesotans, but people all over the world, and is a positive influence on her fans through her example of truthfulness, grace, extensive philanthropy, and strength of character".

=== Awards ===
Year	Organization	Award	Result	Ref.
2018	Billboard Live Music Awards	Top U.S. Tour	Won	
2018	Billboard Live Music Awards	Top Tour	Nominated	
2018	Billboard Live Music Awards	Top Boxscore (MetLife Stadium (July 20–22, 2018)	Nominated	
2018	American Music Awards	Tour of the Year	Won	
2018	People's Choice Awards	Concert Tour of the Year	Won	
2018	Guinness World Records	Highest Grossing Music Tour by a Female Artist in 2018	Won	
2018	Teen Choice Awards	Choice Summer Tour	Nominated	
2019	Billboard Live Music Awards	Concert and Marketing Promotions Award (Taylor Swift x Fujifilm Activation for the Reputation Stadium Tour)	Nominated	
2019	Pollstar Awards	Best Pop Tour	Won	
2019	iHeartRadio Music Awards	Tour of the Year	Won	
2019	Ticketmaster Awards	Touring Milestone Award	Won	
2020	Art Directors Guild Awards	Variety, Reality or Competition Series	Nominated	

== Set list ==
This set list is from the concert on May 8, 2018, in Glendale, Arizona. It is not intended to represent all shows throughout the tour.

1. "...Ready for It?"
2. "I Did Something Bad"
3. "Gorgeous"
4. "Style" / "Love Story" / "You Belong with Me"
5. "Look What You Made Me Do"
6. "End Game"
7. "King of My Heart"
8. "Delicate"
9. "Shake It Off" (with Camila Cabello and Charli XCX)
10. "Dancing with Our Hands Tied"
11. Surprise song
12. "Blank Space"
13. "Dress"
14. "Bad Blood" / "Should've Said No"
15. "Don't Blame Me"
16. "Long Live" / "New Year's Day"
17. "Getaway Car"
18. "Call It What You Want"
19. "We Are Never Ever Getting Back Together" / "This Is Why We Can't Have Nice Things"

=== Surprise songs ===
The following songs were performed by Swift as surprise songs:

- Glendale, Pasadena (second show), and Arlington (second show): "All Too Well"
- Santa Clara (first show) and Tokyo (second show): "Wildest Dreams"
- Santa Clara (second show): "The Best Day"
- Pasadena (first show): "Red"
- Seattle: "Holy Ground"
- Denver: "Teardrops on My Guitar"
- Chicago (first show): "Our Song"
- Chicago (second show), Foxborough (first show), and Sydney: "22"
- Manchester (first show) and Perth: "I Knew You Were Trouble"
- Manchester (second show): "I Don't Wanna Live Forever"
- Dublin (first show): "Mean"
- Dublin (second show): "How You Get the Girl"
- London (first show): "So It Goes..."
- London (second show): "Fifteen"
- Louisville: "Mine"
- Columbus: "Sparks Fly"
- Landover (first show): "State of Grace"
- Landover (second show): "Haunted"
- Philadelphia (first show): "Never Grow Up"
- Philadelphia (second show): "Treacherous"
- Cleveland: "Babe"
- East Rutherford (first show): "Welcome to New York"
- East Rutherford (second show): "Fearless"
- East Rutherford (third show): "Enchanted"
- Foxborough (second show): "Change"
- Foxborough (third show): "Ours"
- Toronto (first show) and Auckland: "Out of the Woods"
- Toronto (second show): "Come Back... Be Here"
- Pittsburgh: "A Place in This World"
- Atlanta (first show): "This Love"
- Atlanta (second show): "The Lucky One"
- Tampa: "Invisible"
- Miami Gardens: "Breathe"
- Nashville: "Better Man"
- Detroit: "Jump Then Fall"
- Minneapolis (first show): "Begin Again"
- Minneapolis (second show): "Tied Together with a Smile"
- Kansas City: "The Story of Us"
- Indianapolis: "Forever & Always"
- St. Louis: "Hey Stephen"
- New Orleans: "Speak Now"
- Houston: "Wonderland"
- Arlington (first show): "White Horse"
- Melbourne: "I'm Only Me When I'm with You"
- Brisbane: "Starlight"
- Tokyo (first show): "I Know Places"

=== Notes ===
- At the first show in Landover, the second show in Philadelphia, the third show in East Rutherford, the third show in Foxborough, the second show in Minneapolis, the second show in Toronto, and the second show in Tokyo, Swift performed "So It Goes..." in place of "Dancing with Our Hands Tied".
- At the second show in Philadelphia, Swift performed "Our Song" and "Wildest Dreams" a cappella after the levitating basket stage used during "Delicate" malfunctioned.
- At the second show in East Rutherford, Swift performed "Clean" before the "Long Live" / "New Year's Day" medley.

=== Special guests ===
On select dates, Swift performed a duet with a special guest.

- May 18, 2018 – Pasadena: "There's Nothing Holdin' Me Back" with Shawn Mendes
- May 19, 2018 – Pasadena: "My My My!" with Troye Sivan; "Hands to Myself" with Selena Gomez
- June 22, 2018 – London: "Slow Hands" with Niall Horan
- June 23, 2018 – London: "Angels" with Robbie Williams
- July 26, 2018 – Foxborough: "Curious" with Hayley Kiyoko
- August 4, 2018 – Toronto: "Summer of '69" with Bryan Adams
- August 25, 2018 – Nashville: "Tim McGraw" with Tim McGraw and Faith Hill
- October 5, 2018 – Arlington: "The Middle" with Maren Morris
- October 6, 2018 – Arlington: "Babe" with Sugarland

== Concert film ==
Taylor Swift: Reputation Stadium Tour is a concert film documenting the second performance at AT&T Stadium in Arlington, Texas, of the Reputation Stadium Tour. It was released on December 31, 2018, exclusively via Netflix for a limited time.

Swift announced on social media on her birthday, December 13, that the concert film would be released globally in partnership with Netflix on New Year's Eve. It was filmed on the last day of the North American leg of the tour. For their work on the film, Tamlyn Wright and Baz Halpin were nominated in the category "Variety, Reality or Event Special" at the 24th Art Directors Guild Annual Excellence in Production Design Awards. The film left Netflix on December 30, 2023, five years after its original release.

=== Critical reception ===
The film received widespread critical acclaim upon release, with many critics labeling the film as "immortalizing" and "unforgettable". Commentators praised the camerawork from director Paul Dugdale for documenting Swift's "stardom", the crowd's emotions, and the production involved in the concert. Rolling Stone's Rob Sheffield wrote that the film "immortalizes her best tour yet" and that the film shows off "the stadium-rocking spectacle without toning down any of her songs' one-on-one emotional intimacy". Describing the Netflix special as "the end of an era", Amanda Petrusich of The New Yorker opined that the film "will soon either be regarded as a museum piece or as a testament to Swift's era-defying longevity".

Billboard's Denis Warner stated that the film "illuminates the singer's power, dedication, and strength as an artist". He further stated that the film "allows you to get more of a feel of the singer as a performer – and experience just how delicately everything is staged" and appreciated Swift for giving "a gorgeous look into her [Swift's] world as one of today's greatest entertainers". Decider's Benjamin Smith called the film as an "intimate document of an impersonal event". He further expanded that Swift "will stand the test of time more than her fellow early 21st century pop queens", stating the reason "Taylor Swift is perhaps the only one who has figured out a way to turn her music into something more than mere pop". Complimenting Swift's connection with her fans, Nardin Saad of Los Angeles Times stated that "the 10-time Grammy-winner's star power is tantamount as evidenced" in the film.

Katie Collins of CNET opined that the film "serves as a reminder that no matter what else happens, Swift's stardom is perennial" and praised the film for "the divine showcase of the costumes, the dancing and especially Swift's own barely-contained effervescent joy at being on stage". She further complimented the camerawork, stating "closeups brought new insights" into the show. Nicholas Hautman of Us Weekly appreciated the camerawork for depicting "the fans hysterically crying and screaming in support of their idol". Writing for Uproxx, Chloe Gilke labelled the film as a "masterful documentation of the magical energy at a pop show" and as "a love letter to the audience at her shows, and to her fans", while stating that the film "honors the sacred joy of her [Swift's] performance that night, and the people who made it happen". She lauded the camerawork for capturing "the massive scope of the production from every angle," and the audio which "is crystal-clear and beautiful, with the crowd quieted down so viewers at home can hear Swift best."

=== Cultural impact ===
Film director David Lowery cited the tour film as an inspiration for his 2026 psychological thriller film Mother Mary, calling it "one of the best concert films ever" and explaining that they "were literally using Reputation as a guide" during filming.

=== Featured performances ===
1. "...Ready for It?"
2. "I Did Something Bad"
3. "Gorgeous"
4. "Style" / "Love Story" / "You Belong with Me"
5. "Look What You Made Me Do"
6. "End Game"
7. "King of My Heart"
8. "Delicate"
9. "Shake It Off" (with Camila Cabello and Charli XCX)
10. "Dancing with Our Hands Tied"
11. "All Too Well"
12. "Blank Space"
13. "Dress"
14. "Bad Blood" / "Should've Said No"
15. "Don't Blame Me"
16. "Long Live" / "New Year's Day"
17. "Getaway Car"
18. "Call It What You Want"
19. "We Are Never Ever Getting Back Together" / "This Is Why We Can't Have Nice Things"

== Tour dates ==
List of 2018 concerts, showing date, city, country, venue, opening acts, attendance and gross revenue
Date (2018)	City	Country	Venue	Opening acts	Attendance	Revenue
May 8	Glendale	United States	University of Phoenix Stadium	Camila Cabello; Charli XCX	59,157 / 59,157	$7,214,478
May 11	Santa Clara	United States	Levi's Stadium	Camila Cabello; Charli XCX	107,550 / 107,550	$14,006,963
May 12	Santa Clara	United States	Levi's Stadium	Camila Cabello; Charli XCX	107,550 / 107,550	$14,006,963
May 18	Pasadena	United States	Rose Bowl	Camila Cabello; Charli XCX	118,084 / 118,084	$16,251,980
May 19	Pasadena	United States	Rose Bowl	Camila Cabello; Charli XCX	118,084 / 118,084	$16,251,980
May 22	Seattle	United States	CenturyLink Field	Charli XCX (Note: Due to hospitalization from dehydration and orders from doctors, Cabello cancelled her appearance for the Seattle show.)	56,021 / 56,021	$8,672,219
May 25	Denver	United States	Sports Authority Field at Mile High	Camila Cabello; Charli XCX	57,140 / 57,140	$7,926,366
June 1	Chicago	United States	Soldier Field	Camila Cabello; Charli XCX	105,208 / 105,208	$14,576,697
June 2	Chicago	United States	Soldier Field	Camila Cabello; Charli XCX	105,208 / 105,208	$14,576,697
June 8	Manchester	England	Etihad Stadium	Camila Cabello; Charli XCX	77,258 / 77,258	$6,169,724
June 9	Manchester	England	Etihad Stadium	Camila Cabello; Charli XCX	77,258 / 77,258	$6,169,724
June 15	Dublin	Ireland	Croke Park	Camila Cabello; Charli XCX	133,034 / 133,034	$8,567,769
June 16	Dublin	Ireland	Croke Park	Camila Cabello; Charli XCX	133,034 / 133,034	$8,567,769
June 22	London	England	Wembley Stadium	Camila Cabello; Charli XCX	143,427 / 143,427	$12,214,933
June 23	London	England	Wembley Stadium	Camila Cabello; Charli XCX	143,427 / 143,427	$12,214,933
June 30	Louisville	United States	Cardinal Stadium	Camila Cabello; Charli XCX	52,138 / 52,138	$4,928,219
July 7	Columbus	United States	Ohio Stadium	Camila Cabello; Charli XCX	62,897 / 62,897	$6,606,529
July 10	Landover	United States	FedExField	Camila Cabello; Charli XCX	95,672 / 95,672	$11,396,004
July 11	Landover	United States	FedExField	Camila Cabello; Charli XCX	95,672 / 95,672	$11,396,004
July 13	Philadelphia	United States	Lincoln Financial Field	Camila Cabello; Charli XCX	107,378 / 107,378	$11,951,047
July 14	Philadelphia	United States	Lincoln Financial Field	Camila Cabello; Charli XCX	107,378 / 107,378	$11,951,047
July 17	Cleveland	United States	FirstEnergy Stadium	Camila Cabello; Charli XCX	51,323 / 51,323	$5,148,757
July 20	East Rutherford	United States	MetLife Stadium	Camila Cabello; Charli XCX	165,654 / 165,654	$22,031,386
July 21	East Rutherford	United States	MetLife Stadium	Camila Cabello; Charli XCX	165,654 / 165,654	$22,031,386
July 22	East Rutherford	United States	MetLife Stadium	Camila Cabello; Charli XCX	165,654 / 165,654	$22,031,386
July 26	Foxborough	United States	Gillette Stadium	Camila Cabello; Charli XCX	174,764 / 174,764	$21,779,846
July 27	Foxborough	United States	Gillette Stadium	Camila Cabello; Charli XCX	174,764 / 174,764	$21,779,846
July 28	Foxborough	United States	Gillette Stadium	Camila Cabello; Charli XCX	174,764 / 174,764	$21,779,846
August 3	Toronto	Canada	Rogers Centre	Camila Cabello; Charli XCX	100,310 / 100,310	$11,177,000
August 4	Toronto	Canada	Rogers Centre	Camila Cabello; Charli XCX	100,310 / 100,310	$11,177,000
August 7	Pittsburgh	United States	Heinz Field	Camila Cabello; Charli XCX	56,445 / 56,445	$6,230,876
August 10	Atlanta	United States	Mercedes-Benz Stadium	Camila Cabello; Charli XCX	116,746 / 116,746	$18,089,415
August 11	Atlanta	United States	Mercedes-Benz Stadium	Camila Cabello; Charli XCX	116,746 / 116,746	$18,089,415
August 14	Tampa	United States	Raymond James Stadium	Camila Cabello; Charli XCX	55,909 / 55,909	$7,244,264
August 18	Miami Gardens	United States	Hard Rock Stadium	Camila Cabello; Charli XCX	47,818 / 47,818	$7,072,164
August 25	Nashville	United States	Nissan Stadium	Camila Cabello; Charli XCX	56,112 / 56,112	$9,007,179
August 28	Detroit	United States	Ford Field	Camila Cabello; Charli XCX	49,464 / 49,464	$6,597,852
August 31	Minneapolis	United States	U.S. Bank Stadium	Camila Cabello; Charli XCX	98,774 / 98,774	$10,242,024
September 1	Minneapolis	United States	U.S. Bank Stadium	Camila Cabello; Charli XCX	98,774 / 98,774	$10,242,024
September 8	Kansas City	United States	Arrowhead Stadium	Camila Cabello; Charli XCX	58,611 / 58,611	$6,730,138
September 15	Indianapolis	United States	Lucas Oil Stadium	Camila Cabello; Charli XCX	55,729 / 55,729	$6,531,245
September 18	St. Louis	United States	The Dome at America's Center	Camila Cabello; Charli XCX	47,831 / 47,831	$4,884,054
September 22	New Orleans	United States	Mercedes-Benz Superdome	Camila Cabello; Charli XCX	53,172 / 53,172	$6,491,546
September 29	Houston	United States	NRG Stadium	Camila Cabello; Charli XCX	53,800 / 53,800	$9,350,275
October 5	Arlington	United States	AT&T Stadium	Camila Cabello; Charli XCX	105,002 / 105,002	$15,006,157
October 6	Arlington	United States	AT&T Stadium	Camila Cabello; Charli XCX	105,002 / 105,002	$15,006,157
October 19	Perth	Australia	Optus Stadium	Charli XCX; Broods	50,891 / 50,891	$4,153,658
October 26	Melbourne	Australia	Marvel Stadium	Charli XCX; Broods	63,027 / 63,027	$6,755,570
November 2	Sydney	Australia	ANZ Stadium	Charli XCX; Broods	72,805 / 72,805	$7,686,564
November 6	Brisbane	Australia	The Gabba	Charli XCX; Broods	43,907 / 43,907	$4,338,127
November 9	Auckland	New Zealand	Mount Smart Stadium	Charli XCX; Broods	35,749 / 35,749	$3,617,593
November 20	Tokyo	Japan	Tokyo Dome	Charli XCX	100,109 / 100,109	$14,859,847
November 21	Tokyo	Japan	Tokyo Dome	Charli XCX	100,109 / 100,109	$14,859,847
Total					2,888,922 / 2,888,922 (100%)	$345,675,146

== Personnel ==
- Taylor Swift – lead vocals, guitar, piano

Band

- Max Bernstein – guitar, keyboards
- Matt Billingslea – drums
- David Cook - musical director, keyboards
- Amos Heller – bass, synth bass
- Mike Meadows – guitar, keyboards, backing vocals
- Paul Sidoti – guitar
- Jeslyn Gorman – backing vocals
- Kamilah Marshall – backing vocals
- Melanie Nyema – backing vocals
- Eliotte Woodford – backing vocals

Dancers

- Maho Udo - dance captain
- Grant Gilmore
- Stephanie Mincone
- Nadine Olmo
- Toshi Davidson
- Jake Kodish
- Robert Green
- Jake Landgrebe
- Giuseppe Giofre
- Mark Villaver
- Christian Owens
- Jazz Smith
- Gracie Stewart
- Maria Wada
- Yorelis Apolinario
- Christian Hendersen

== See also ==
- List of highest-grossing concert tours by women
- List of original films distributed by Netflix
