= Gorgeous (Taylor Swift song) =

2017 song by Taylor Swift

- Promotional graphic

Promotional single by Taylor Swift

from the album Reputation
- Released: October 20, 2017
- Studio: MXM (Los Angeles/Stockholm)
- Genre: Bubblegum pop; electropop; synth-pop
- Length: 3:29
- Label: Big Machine
- Songwriters: Taylor Swift; Max Martin; Shellback
- Producers: Max Martin; Shellback

Lyric video
- "Gorgeous" on YouTube

"Gorgeous" is a song by the American singer-songwriter Taylor Swift from her sixth studio album, Reputation (2017). She wrote the song with its producers, Max Martin and Shellback. A bubblegum pop, electropop, and synth-pop song, "Gorgeous" features a loop backed by minimal hip-hop drum machine beats, synthesizers, occasional acoustic guitars, and a triangle ding before the refrain. Inspired by Swift's relationship with the English actor Joe Alwyn, the lyrics are flirtatious confessions to a newfound romantic interest: the narrator jokingly tells this man that his striking beauty makes her miserable and yearning for more.

Before the album's release, Big Machine Records issued "Gorgeous" for download on October 20, 2017. Critical reception of the song was mixed: some reviews complimented its simple lyrics and production, but some others deemed the songwriting subpar for Swift's abilities. The track reached the top 20 on charts and received certifications in Australia, the United Kingdom, and the United States. Swift included "Gorgeous" in the set list of her 2018 Reputation Stadium Tour, and she performed it twice on the Eras Tour in 2023 and 2024.

== Production and release ==
Taylor Swift wrote "Gorgeous" with the Swedish producers Max Martin and Shellback for her sixth studio album, Reputation. The song was also produced by Martin and Shellback. It was engineered at MXM Studios in Los Angeles and Stockholm, Sweden. The track was mixed by Serban Ghenea at MixStar Studios in Virginia Beach, Virginia; and mastered by Randy Merrill at Sterling Sound Studios in New York. On October 19, 2017, Swift gave a preview of the song in an Instagram post which featured a baby voice saying the word "gorgeous" over an electropop production. The baby's voice featured on the song is that of James Reynolds, a daughter of actors Blake Lively and Ryan Reynolds. Swift decided to feature the baby's voice after she played an acoustic guitar demo to Lively and Reynolds and then their daughter kept saying the word "gorgeous". On October 20, "Gorgeous" was released for digital download as a promotional single. It was the third song issued preceding the release of Reputation, following the singles "Look What You Made Me Do" and "...Ready for It?".

Swift performed "Gorgeous" as part of her set list for the B96 Chicago and Pepsi Jingle Bash 2017 on December 7, 2017, in Chicago. Swift also sang the song during the Jingle Bell Ball 2017 in London and at BBC Radio 1's Big Weekend in Swansea. The song was included in the set-list for her Reputation Stadium Tour (2018). Swift also performed "Gorgeous" as a surprise song on the Eras Tour on April 29, 2023, in Atlanta. She sang the track again as a mashup with her song "I Think He Knows" (2019) on May 17, 2024, in the tour's stop at Stockholm.

== Composition ==
"Gorgeous"
An electropop song with 808 drums and a loop instrumented by minimal synthesizers, "Gorgeous" talks about Swift's feelings for her newfound love interest.

"Gorgeous" is a bubblegum pop, electropop, and synth-pop song. Compared to the two previous Reputation singles ("Look What You Made Me Do" and "...Ready for It?"), "Gorgeous" features a brighter atmosphere with a "radio-friendly" production. The track includes a gleeful loop accompanied by minimal synthesizers and drums, and occasional acoustic guitar sounds. The pre-chorus is backed by a drum beat reminiscent of 808 drums used in hip hop music. Annie Zaleski wrote that the track's rhythm resembles sounds of a ticking clock. Swift sings in a high, carefree tone. Chris Willman from Variety drew similarities between the song and Swift's previous single "Blank Space" (2014). Maeve McDermott of USA Today likened the chorus of the song to the music of Katy Perry. The Atlantic's Spencer Kornhaber commented that the song's drums in the pre-chorus reminded him of hip hop songs, specifically the 2004 single "Drop It Like It's Hot" by Snoop Dogg featuring Pharrell Williams.

Lyrically, the song depicts Swift getting infatuated with a new love interest that is too beautiful and seems unattainable, inspired by Swift's relationship with the English actor Joe Alwyn. "Gorgeous" begins with a baby's voice saying the word "gorgeous", sampling the voice of James Reynolds, daughter of Blake Lively and Ryan Reynolds. In the track, Swift portrays a promiscuous aspect in an attempt to get the attention of a prospective lover. She confesses that she is prompted to cheat on her boyfriend in order to get along with this new man, through the lines, "I got a boyfriend, he's older than us / He's in the club doing I don't know what." She gets melodramatic, singing "You've ruined my life by not being mine", which is followed by a triangle ding. In the refrain, Swift restates that her love interest is so "gorgeous" that she "can't say anything to [his] face", leaving her dumbstruck. Compared to her previous songs about unrequited love or hopeless romance, "Gorgeous" sees Swift assuming a more assertive position: "I'm so furious / At you for making me feel this way." She no longer gets overtly heartbroken should the relationship with this person not come true: "Guess I'll just stumble on home to my cats... alone."

== Critical reception ==
The song garnered mixed reviews from critics. In a positive review, Maeve McDermott of USA Today called it a proof for Swift's "domination". Christopher Rosa from Glamour stated that it was evidence that Swift was "single-handedly saving pop music in 2017," calling it "fizzy" and "delightful". In a review for Variety, Chris William called it a pop song that offers "conventional pleasures", and appreciated it as a welcoming reminder of Swift's abilities as a songwriter, after the dark sounds of Reputation's previous singles "Look What You Made Me Do" and "...Ready for It?". Jon Blistein of Rolling Stone agreed, calling it the "yang to the vindictive, angry yin" of "Look What You Made Me Do".

Clayton Purdom from The A.V. Club wrote that the song "clears the low bar set by its two predecessors ['Look What You Made Me Do' and '...Ready for It?']", calling it "an extremely basic and extremely good" song. Entertainment Weekly's Eric Renner Brown gave it a B+, deeming it a welcoming sign of Swift's songwriting skills compared to the petty lyrics of the two previous Reputation singles. Richard S. He from Billboard was less complimentary, calling the lyrics clumsy: "For the first time ever, [Swift's] so tongue-tied she can't even think of a rhyme." Spencer Kornhaber of The Atlantic praised the song's catchy production and straightforward lyrics, but felt that the song's hip hop influences proved that Swift was becoming another unoriginal singer "[attempting] to convey new edge, new danger, by trying on a little more syncopation".

Frank Guan of New York, while saying that the song "isn't terrible", was disappointed with the production and lyrics. Guan deemed the romantic narrative of the song "disjointed and implausible", and Swift's delivery akin to a "malfunctioning android". He added that judging from the vengeance and drama-filled lyrics of the previous Reputation singles, "Gorgeous" proved that Swift was becoming "a woman whose tremendous success has magnified her resentments to the point where she can't even enjoy the happiest of emotions: falling in love". Similarly, Jordan Sargent from Spin felt that the song, whose narrative was a step down from Swift's traditional vivid songwriting, was overshadowed by the dark and tumultuous promotional campaign for Reputation and its lead single "Look What You Made Me Do".

== Commercial performance ==
In the U.S., "Gorgeous" debuted at number 13 on the Billboard Hot 100 chart dated October 30, 2017. Despite not being released to radio, the song drew 3.6 million in all-format airplay audience. On the Digital Songs chart, it was Swift's 14th number-one chart entry, extending Swift's record as the artist with the most Digital Songs number-one debuts (13). This made Reputation the first album since Drake's Views (2016) to spawn three or more Digital Songs number ones, and the first album by a female artist since Swift's 1989 (2014) to do so. "Gorgeous" spent four weeks on the Billboard Hot 100. It was certified gold by the Recording Industry Association of America (RIAA) for exceeding 500,000 units based on sales and on-demand streaming.

In the U.K., where "Gorgeous" was added to BBC Radio 1's playlist, it peaked at number 15 on the UK Singles Chart and was certified platinum (600,000 units) by the British Phonographic Industry (BPI). In Australia, the track peaked at number nine on the ARIA Singles Chart, becoming Reputation's third top-10 chart entry. It was certified triple platinum by the Australian Recording Industry Association. In Brazil, the song received a gold certification from Pro-Música Brasil (PMB). Elsewhere, "Gorgeous" entered the top 10 on charts of Malaysia (eight), Canada (nine), and Hungary (nine). "Gorgeous" was a top-20 chart entry in Scotland (12), the Philippines (13), Lebanon (15), Slovakia (17), Ireland (18), and New Zealand (19). The song peaked at number 15 on the Euro Digital Song Sales, a Billboard chart ranking the best-selling digital singles in Europe. It additionally charted within the top 40 on charts in Austria, the Czech Republic, Norway, Portugal, and Slovenia.

== Credits and personnel ==
Credits are adapted from the liner notes of Reputation.

- Taylor Swift – vocals, songwriter
- Max Martin – producer, songwriter, programming, keyboards
- Shellback – producer, songwriter, programming, keyboards, guitars
- Sam Holland – engineer
- Michael Ilbert – engineer
- Cory Bice – assistant engineer
- Jeremy Lertola – assistant engineer
- Serban Ghenea – mixing
- John Hanes – mix engineer
- Randy Merrill – mastering
- James Reynolds – baby voice intro

== Charts ==
Weekly chart performance for "Gorgeous"
Chart (2017–2018)	Peak position
Australia (ARIA)	9
Austria (Ö3 Austria Top 40)	32
Belgium (Ultratip Bubbling Under Flanders)	1
Belgium (Ultratip Bubbling Under Wallonia)	17
Canada Hot 100 (Billboard)	9
Canada Hot AC (Billboard)	45
Czech Republic Singles Digital (ČNS IFPI)	24
Euro Digital Song Sales (Billboard)	15
Denmark Airplay (Tracklisten)	13
Finland Download (Latauslista)	22
France (SNEP Sales Chart)	64
Germany (GfK)	45
Germany Airplay (BVMI)	6
Hungary (Single Top 40)	9
Hungary (Stream Top 40)	23
Ireland (IRMA)	18
Italy (FIMI)	66
Japan Hot 100 (Billboard)	52
Lebanon (Lebanese Top 20)	15
Malaysia (RIM)	8
Netherlands (Single Top 100)	60
New Zealand (Recorded Music NZ)	19
Norway (VG-lista)	28
Philippines (Philippine Hot 100)	13
Portugal (AFP)	40
Scottish Singles Sales (Official Charts)	12
Slovakia Singles Digital (ČNS IFPI)	17
Slovenia (SloTop50)	26
South Korean International Singles (Gaon)	52
Sweden (Sverigetopplistan)	41
Switzerland (Schweizer Hitparade)	46
UK Singles (Official Charts)	15
US Billboard Hot 100	13

== Certifications ==
Certifications for "Gorgeous"
Region	Certification	Certified units/sales
Australia (ARIA)	3× Platinum	210,000^{‡}
Brazil (Pro-Música Brasil)	Platinum	60,000^{‡}
New Zealand (RMNZ)	Platinum	30,000^{‡}
United Kingdom (BPI)	Platinum	600,000^{‡}
United States (RIAA)	Gold	500,000^{‡}
^{‡} Sales+streaming figures based on certification alone.

== See also ==
- List of number-one digital songs of 2017 (U.S.)
- List of top 10 singles for 2017 in Australia
