= ...Ready for It? =

2017 single by Taylor Swift

- BloodPop remix artwork

Single by Taylor Swift

from the album Reputation
- Released: October 24, 2017
- Studio: MXM (Stockholm)
- Genre: Electro; electropop; industrial pop
- Length: 3:28
- Label: Big Machine
- Songwriters: Taylor Swift; Max Martin; Shellback; Ali Payami
- Producers: Max Martin; Shellback; Ali Payami

Taylor Swift singles chronology
"Look What You Made Me Do" (2017)	"...Ready for It?" (2017)	"End Game" (2017)

Music video
- "...Ready for It?" on YouTube

"...Ready for It?" is a song by the American singer-songwriter Taylor Swift from her sixth studio album, Reputation (2017). She wrote the song with its producers: Max Martin, Shellback, and Ali Payami. An electro, electropop and industrial pop song, "...Ready for It?" incorporates elements of dancehall, tropical house, hip-hop, and trap. It features Swift rap-singing over heavy synthesizers, bass drops, and programmed drums. Lyrically, the track uses criminal imagery such as a bank heist and ransom to depict lust and infatuation in a newfound romantic connection.

Swift premiered "...Ready for It?" during an ESPN college football match on September 2, 2017; the following day, Big Machine Records released the song for digital download. The single was released to US radio as the second single from Reputation on October 24, 2017. Music critics generally described the production of "...Ready for It?" as anthemic and considered it a better single choice than Reputation's lead single "Look What You Made Me Do". While most reviews praised the production elements, several regarded the track as generic and indiscernible from mainstream trends.

The single both peaked within the top 10 and received platinum certifications in Australia, Canada, New Zealand, the United Kingdom, and the United States. The accompanying music video, directed by Joseph Kahn, features a dark, futuristic aesthetic and references sci-fi franchises. It depicts two versions of Swift dueling each other: a black-hooded human version and a mechanized, robotic version. Swift performed "...Ready for It?" live as the opener on the Reputation Stadium Tour (2018) and the first song of the Reputation act on the Eras Tour (2023–2024).

== Background and release ==
Taylor Swift's fifth studio album, 1989, was released in October 2014. Its synth-pop sound and commercial success transformed Swift's status from a country music artist to a global pop star. Her fame was accompanied by tabloid gossip on her celebrity disputes and short-lived relationships, which blemished her "America's Sweetheart" reputation. During a self-imposed hiatus, she secluded from public appearances and conceived her sixth studio album, Reputation, as an answer to the media commotion surrounding her celebrity.

On September 2, 2017, Swift premiered a snippet of "...Ready for It?" during a teaser leading to ABC's Saturday Night Football broadcast of ESPN's Florida State vs. Alabama college football game. A day after the snippet premiered, the track was released for digital download by Big Machine Records, as part of Reputation's pre-order. It was the second song released from Reputation, after the lead single "Look What You Made Me Do". In the United States, although the track initially was not actively promoted to radio, pop radio stations proactively aired it, thus making it gain traction on airplay throughout September and October 2017. It was officially promoted to US rhythmic contemporary radio on October 24, 2017, as the album's second single, by Big Machine Records. A remix by BloodPop was released in December 2017, accompanied by a lyric video.

== Music and lyrics ==
Swift wrote "...Ready for It?" with its producers: Max Martin, Shellback, and Ali Payami. Martin and Shellback recorded the track at MXM Studios in Stockholm, Sweden. All three producers programmed the song and played keyboards on it. "...Ready for It?" was mixed by Serban Ghenea at MixStar Studios in Virginia Beach, Virginia, and mastered by Randy Merrill at Sterling Sound Studios in New York City.

"...Ready for It?"
A sample of the second chorus and instrumental break of "...Ready for It?", depicting Swift's vocals over the heavy electronic production with dense synthesizers and dubstep drops

A genre-blending song, "...Ready for It?" is a maximalist electro, electropop, and industrial pop track with elements of dancehall, reggae, hip-hop, and trap music. The song is written in the key of E minor with a tempo of 80 beats per minute, and Swift's vocals span from G3 to E5. It is driven by heavy synths, a tropical house chorus, dubstep bass drops, EDM and trap beats, programmed drum machines, and Swift's rapping-singing. The track has dynamic shifts through each part: it begins with abrasive dubstep bass beats and Swift clearing her throat, the verses feature her rapping, and the chorus has a less dense arrangement to make room for her breathy vocals. The production elements received comparisons to the music of Kanye West, particularly his 2013 album Yeezus, and Rihanna.

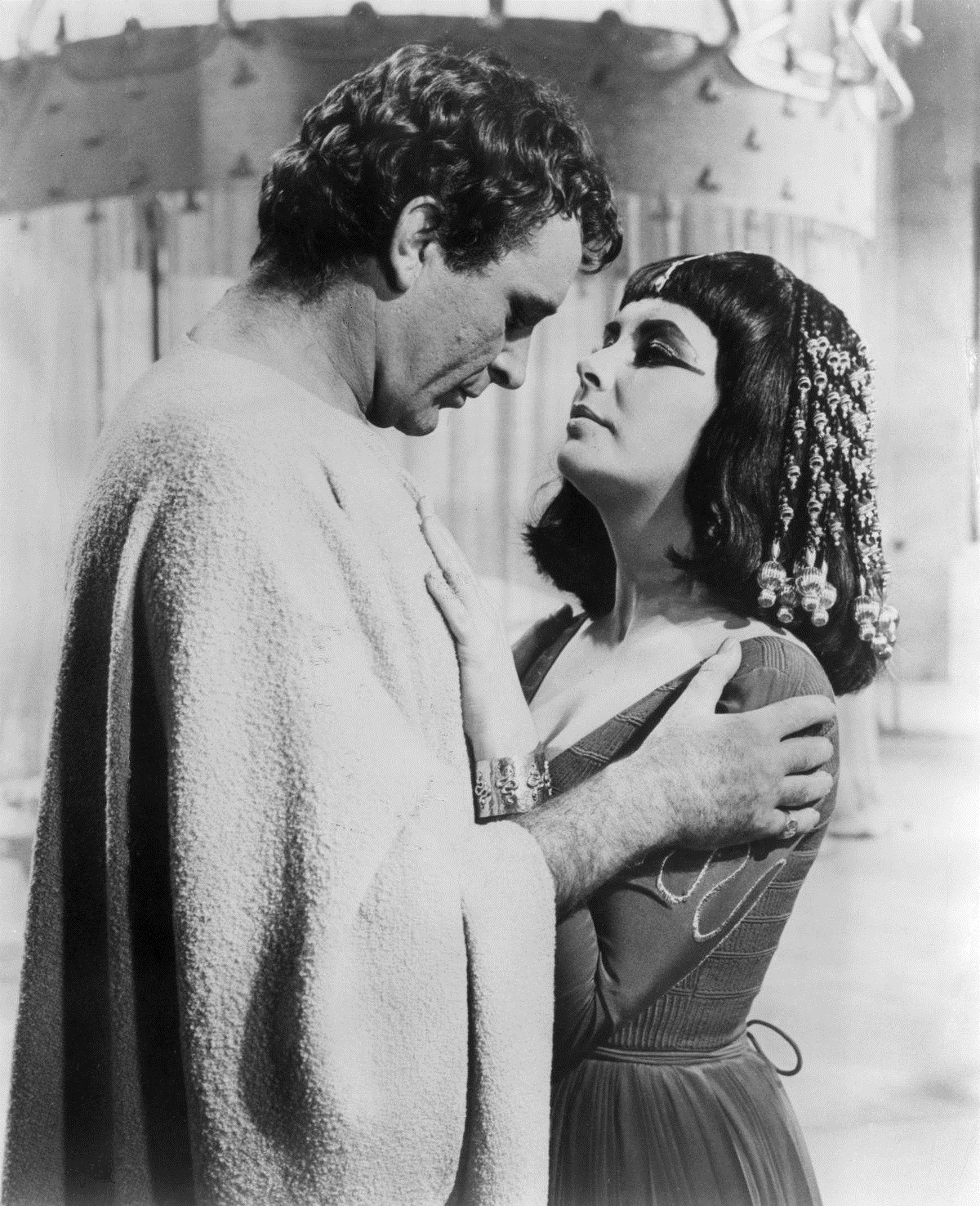
The lyrics liken Swift's romance to that of Richard Burton and Elizabeth Taylor.

Swift wrote "...Ready for It?" about finding a "partner in crime". She was influenced by the novel Crime and Punishment (1866) by Fyodor Dostoevsky to use criminal imagery such as bank robbers, thieves, and heists, finding it an interesting way to write songs about finding love. The lyrics of "...Ready for It?" are about excitement, lust, and infatuation in a burgeoning romance. The opening lines see Swift's narrator being attracted by a man whom she describes as a "killer" the moment she sees him. This man is "younger than [her] exes" but "acts like such a man". In turn, she confesses that she herself is a "robber" who has stolen other men's hearts "never saying sorry". She dreams about "[keeping] him forever" and keeping this relationship private so that nobody can know about it. She compares her romance to that of Elizabeth Taylor and Richard Burton, implying the complications of stardom and privacy.

== Critical reception ==
Upon its release, "...Ready for It?" was seen by many critics as an improvement from Reputation's lead single "Look What You Made Me Do"; The Music's Uppy Chatterjee opined that it should have been the lead single. Favorable reviews considered the song anthemic and catchy. Mary Wang of Vogue described the track as both a love song and a stadium anthem, Patrick Ryan of USA Today lauded the "sparkling, anthemic" chorus, and Shahzaib Hussain of Clash deemed the sound defiant. Tom Breihan of Stereogum was impressed by the musical elements that were new to Swift such as rapping, tropical house, and sudden dynamic changes, writing that she "rides a beat better than anyone could've reasonably expected". In the views of Jon Caramanica of The New York Times, the maximalist pop of "...Ready for It?" represented a new musical direction for Swift, with "harsh sounds and urgent buildup segments to theatrical, bruising effect". Slant Magazine's Alexa Camp thought that the song was carefully constructed with catchy pop melodies and rapping cadences. Kristen He from Billboard wrote that "...Ready for It?" showcased how Swift successfully used her voice as an instrument, in line with mainstream pop production choices, and hailed the chorus for featuring "one of the prettiest melodies of her career".

Less enthusiastic reviews considered the production of "...Ready for It?" generic and the songwriting subpar. In Spin, Jordan Sargent acknowledged that the song is "melodically rich" but considered the metaphors clunky and ineffective and wrote that the song showcased Swift in a "mask" that lost her distinctiveness. Craig Jenkins of Vulture similarly lamented that the track was an effort to keep up with mainstream trends and criticized Swift's experimentation with rapping and hip-hop as a cynical move for her artistic reinvention. According to Frank Guan, also from Vulture, the song sounded too similar to other popular songs on radio. The Daily Telegraph described the lyrics as "wonderfully cringeworthy". The New Zealand Herald's George Fenwick considered "...Ready for It?" one of the worst tracks off the album.

Retrospective reviews have considered "...Ready for It?" an effective opener for Reputation. According to Billboard's Joe Lynch, when the song was first released, "casual listeners were confused, Swifties were challenged, and haters were given a bounty of fresh ammo". Alexis Petridis of The Guardian thought that Swift's rapping was "better than you might expect" and highlighted the "impeccable hook" that had been absent in the lead single "Look What You Made Me Do". Vulture's Nate Jones wrote that he disliked Swift's flow "borrowed from Jay-Z" but regarded the chorus as undeniable. Stereogum ranked "...Ready for It?" among the 40 best pop songs of 2017, and Variety's Chris Willman placed it at number 38 on his 2024 ranking of Swift's 75 best songs. Less complimentary comments were from NME's Hannah Mylrea, who described the song as a messy combination of genres, and Paste's Jane Song, who considered Swift's "vaguely Bahamian accent" in the song "unsettling".

== Commercial performance ==
In the United States, "...Ready for It?" debuted and peaked at number four on the Billboard Hot 100 chart dated September 23, 2017, becoming Swift's 22nd top 10-song and 14th top 10-debut. It also became her 13th number-one song on the Digital Songs chart and opened at 35 on the Pop Songs chart, where it eventually peaked at number 12. On other Billboard charts, "...Ready for It?" peaked at number 10 on Adult Pop Songs, number 26 on Adult Contemporary, and number 37 on Rhythmic. In July 2018, the Recording Industry Association of America awarded the single a double-platinum certification in recognition of two million units sold in the United States.

Elsewhere, "...Ready for It?" entered the top 10 on charts of Australia (number three), Hungary (four), Malaysia (six), Canada (seven), the United Kingdom (seven), Greece (nine), and New Zealand (nine). The single reached the top 20 in Ireland, the Czech Republic, and Lebanon; (Note: References:) and top 40 in Austria, Norway, Portugal, and Sweden. (Note: References:) It has been certified six-times platinum in Australia, and double platinum in Brazil, Canada, New Zealand, and the United Kingdom. (Note: References:)

== Music video ==
The video features two versions of Swift dueling with each other: a cyborg Swift (left) and a human Swift (right). The bodysuit that she wears as a cyborg received backlash for making her appear naked.

The music video was directed by Joseph Kahn. On October 23, 2017, Swift released a teaser of the music video for the song. The teaser received backlash from online commentators and audience, who claimed that Swift appears naked in the teaser. Subsequently, Swift posted an Instagram story denouncing the nudity claims alongside a selfie of her wearing a bodysuit, captioned "It truly warms my heart that ppl had so much to say about this bodysuit." The full video premiered on October 26. It features homage references to sci-fi films like Blade Runner (1982), Tron (1982), Westworld (1973), and Ex Machina (2014); and 1990s manga franchises like Ghost in the Shell and Sailor Moon.

The video's central narrative is a battle between two versions of Swift: a human one and a cyborg one. In this narrative, an imprisoned female robot is eager to break out and avenge her captors. It starts with the human Swift, dressed in a black cloak. She walks through a dark alley and enters a room where the cyborg Swift is held captive in a force field cage. The cyborg Swift mutates into various forms trying to escape, and she eventually breaks through the cell walls, with shards of glass cutting the cloaked Swift across the face, revealing she is a cyborg as well. The cyborg guards try to contain both of them to no avail, and the video ends with the white cyborg Swift walking away from her demolished cell and moving up an escalator.

== Live performances ==
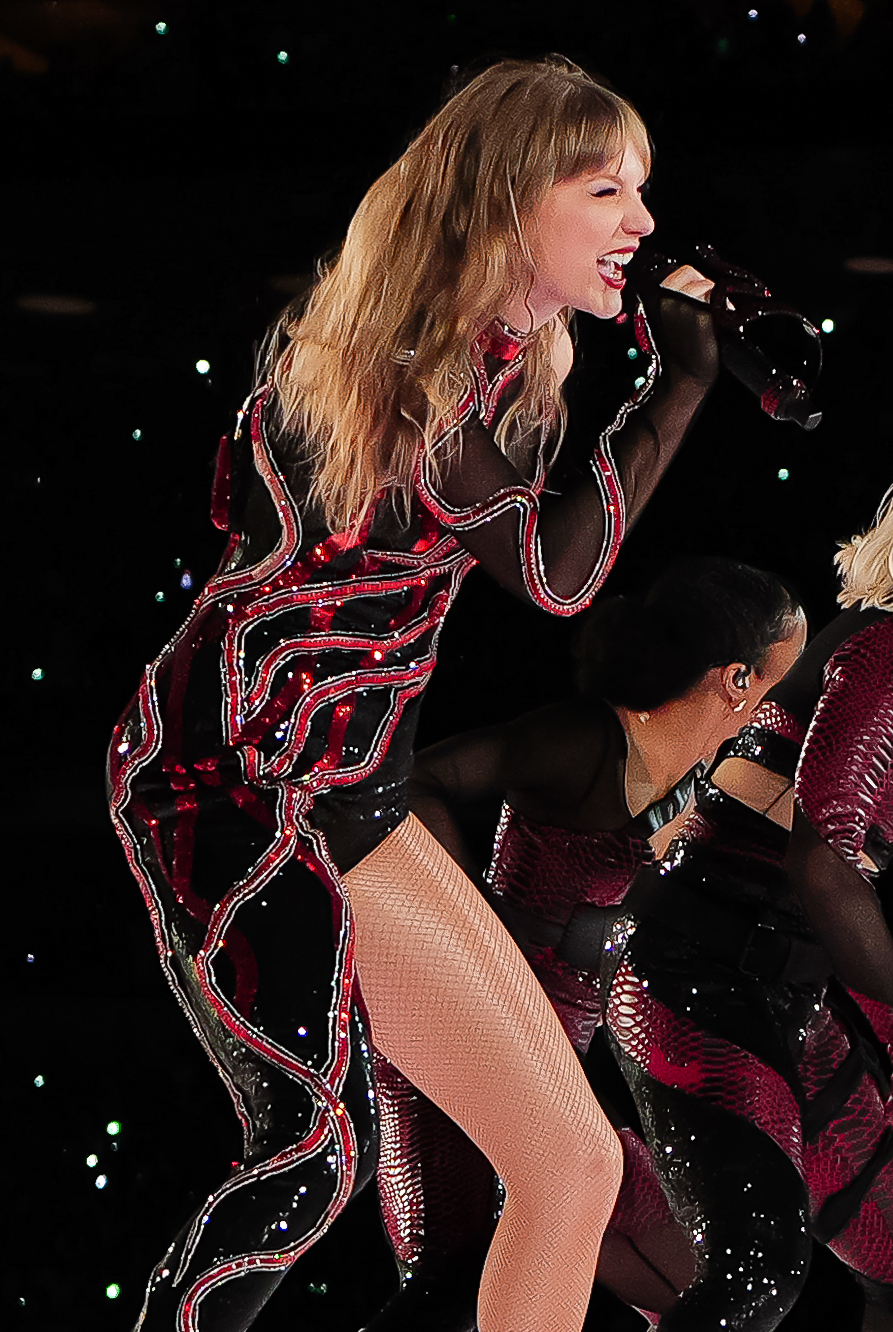
Swift performed "...Ready for It?" on the Eras Tour in 2023 and 2024.

Swift performed "...Ready for It?" for the first time during an episode of the 43rd season of Saturday Night Live on November 11, 2017; she sang the track donning a cropped black sweatshirt and black shorts, backed by a quartet of backing vocalists and dancers. In December 2017, she included "...Ready for It?" in the set lists of several concerts that she participated in, including KIIS-FM's Jingle Ball on December 1, in Inglewood, California, 99.7 Now!'s Poptopia on December 3, in San Jose, California, B96 Chicago and Pepsi's Jingle Bash on December 7, in Chicago, the Z100 Jingle Ball on December 8, in New York City, and the Jingle Bell Ball on December 10, in London, England. On May 27, 2018, Swift performed "...Ready for It?" as the opening number to her set as part of BBC Radio 1's Biggest Weekend in Swansea, Wales.

"...Ready for It?" was the opening number of Swift's 2018 Reputation Stadium Tour. Before the performance began, the intro included news snippets discussing Swift's reputation. The screens onstage then parted, and Swift emerged through the smoke, wearing a black hoodie before revealing herself in a sparkling black bodysuit and knee-high black boots. On the Eras Tour (2023–2024), Swift performed "...Ready for It?" as the opening number for the Reputation segment, which began with stage screens showing imagery of snakes. Swift appeared onstage in a one-legged black catsuit embroidered with snakes motifs.

== Personnel ==
Adapted from the liner notes of Reputation

- Taylor Swift – lead vocals, background vocals, songwriter
- Max Martin – producer, songwriter, recording, keyboards, programming
- Shellback – producer, songwriter, recording, keyboards, programming
- Ali Payami – producer, songwriter, keyboards, programming
- Serban Ghenea – mixing
- John Hanes – engineer for mix
- Randy Merrill – mastering

== Charts ==
=== Weekly charts ===
2017–2018 weekly chart performance for "...Ready for It?"
Chart (2017–18)	Peak position
Australia (ARIA)	3
Austria (Ö3 Austria Top 40)	26
Canada Hot 100 (Billboard)	7
Canada AC (Billboard)	44
Canada CHR/Top 40 (Billboard)	5
Canada Hot AC (Billboard)	12
CIS Airplay (TopHit)	139
Croatia (HRT)	51
Czech Republic Airplay (ČNS IFPI)	18
Czech Republic Singles Digital (ČNS IFPI)	26
Euro Digital Song Sales (Billboard)	4
Finland Download (Latauslista)	10
France (SNEP)	164
Germany (GfK)	47
Greece Digital Songs (Billboard)	3
Greece (IFPI)	9
Hungary (Single Top 40)	4
Hungary (Stream Top 40)	22
Ireland (IRMA)	12
Italy (FIMI)	65
Lebanon (Lebanese Top 20)	20
Malaysia (RIM)	6
Netherlands (Single Top 100)	76
New Zealand (Recorded Music NZ)	9
Norway (VG-lista)	32
Panama Anglo (Monitor Latino)	7
Poland Airplay (ZPAV)	46
Portugal (AFP)	30
Scottish Singles Sales (Official Charts)	3
Slovakia Singles Digital (ČNS IFPI)	25
South Korean International Singles (Gaon)	33
Spain (Promusicae)	70
Sweden (Sverigetopplistan)	32
Switzerland (Schweizer Hitparade)	41
UK Singles (Official Charts)	7
US Billboard Hot 100	4
US Adult Contemporary (Billboard)	26
US Adult Pop Airplay (Billboard)	10
US Dance Club Songs (Billboard)	34
US Pop Airplay (Billboard)	12
US Rhythmic Airplay (Billboard)	37

2024 weekly chart performance for "...Ready for It?"
Chart (2024)	Peak position
Singapore (RIAS)	16

=== Year-end charts ===
2017 year-end charts for "...Ready for It?"
Chart (2017)	Position
El Salvador (Monitor Latino)	82
US Digital Songs (Billboard)	75

2018 year-end chart for "...Ready for It?"
Chart (2018)	Position
US Adult Pop Songs (Billboard)	45

== Certifications ==
Certifications for "...Ready for It?"
Region	Certification	Certified units/sales
Australia (ARIA)	6× Platinum	420,000^{‡}
Brazil (Pro-Música Brasil)	2× Platinum	120,000^{‡}
Canada (Music Canada)	2× Platinum	160,000^{‡}
Denmark (IFPI Danmark)	Gold	45,000^{‡}
France (SNEP)	Gold	100,000^{‡}
Germany (BVMI)	Gold	300,000^{‡}
Italy (FIMI)	Gold	50,000^{‡}
New Zealand (RMNZ)	2× Platinum	60,000^{‡}
Norway (IFPI Norway)	Gold	30,000^{‡}
Poland (ZPAV)	Gold	10,000^{‡}
Spain (Promusicae)	Gold	20,000^{‡}
Sweden (GLF)	Gold	20,000^{‡}
United Kingdom (BPI)	2× Platinum	1,200,000^{‡}
United States (RIAA)	2× Platinum	2,000,000^{‡}
^{‡} Sales+streaming figures based on certification alone.

== Release history ==
Release dates and formats for "...Ready for It?"
Region	Date	Format(s)	Version	Label	Ref.
Various	September 3, 2017 (Note: Release as a promotional single)	Digital download; streaming	Original	Big Machine	
United States	October 24, 2017	Rhythmic radio	Original	Big Machine	
Various	December 1, 2017	Digital download; streaming	BloodPop remix	Big Machine	

== See also ==
- List of number-one digital songs of 2017 (U.S.)
- List of Billboard Hot 100 top-ten singles in 2017
- List of UK top-ten singles in 2017
- List of top 10 singles for 2017 in Australia
