= List of UK top-ten singles in 2017 =

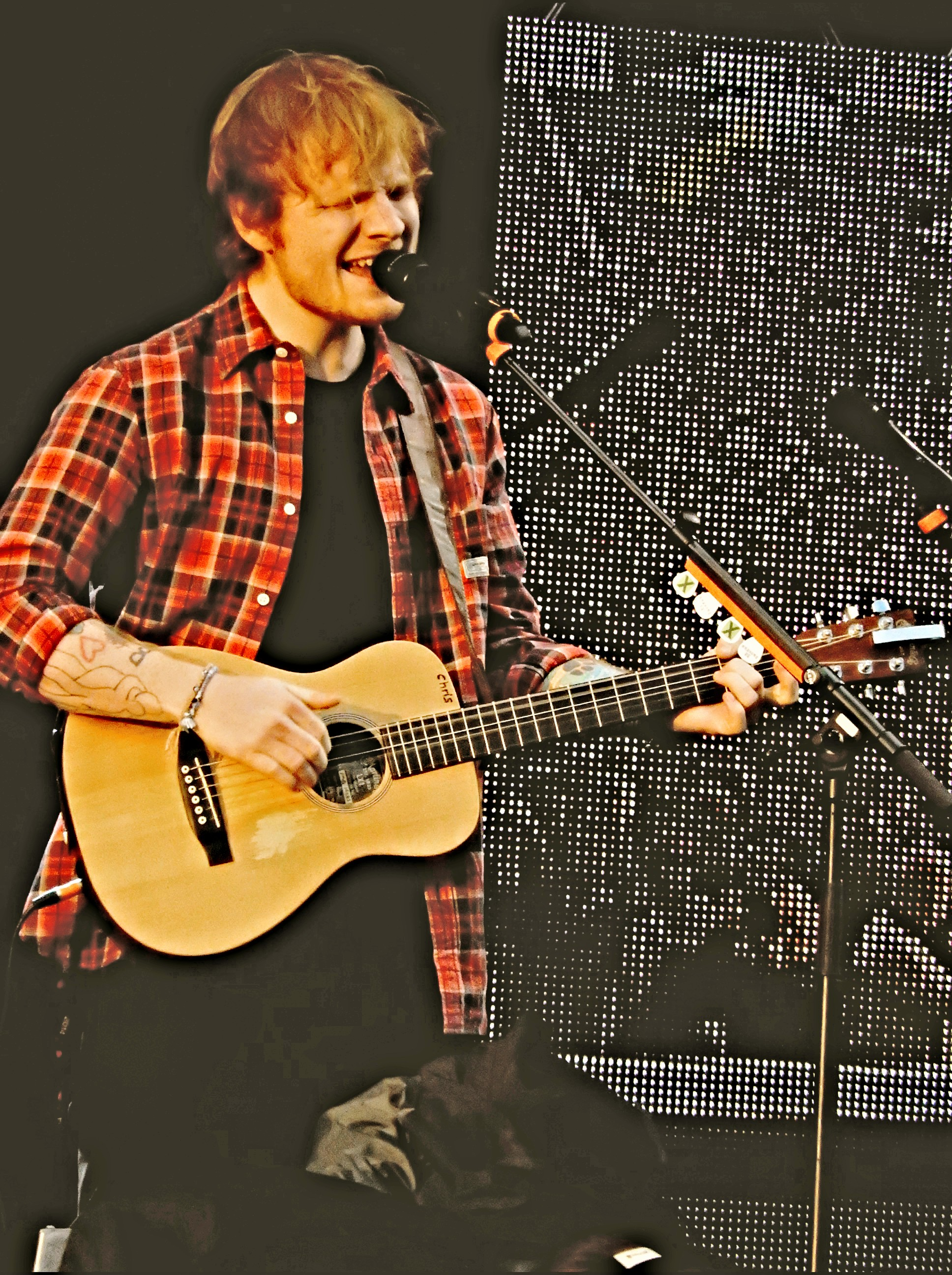
Ed Sheeran was the dominant artist of 2017, achieving a total of 11 UK top 10 singles during the year, two of which topped the chart. "Shape of You" became both the longest-reigning number-one single and the best-selling single of the year. Ten of the sixteen tracks from his third studio album ÷ reached the top 10. The remix of "Perfect" featuring Beyoncé helped the song to become the year's Christmas number-one single.

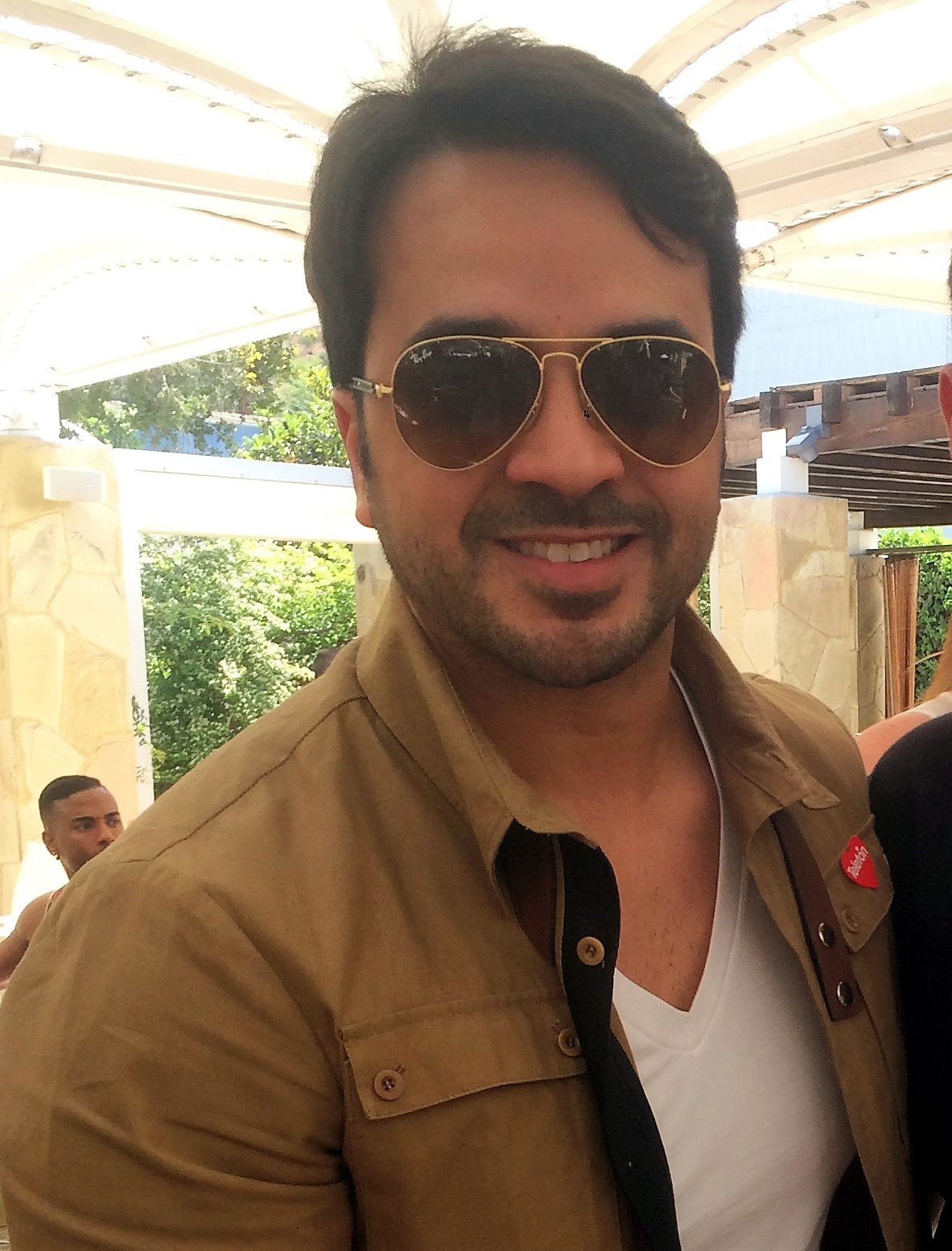
Luis Fonsi collaborated with fellow Puerto Rican Daddy Yankee on "Despacito", which, thanks to the release of a remix featuring Justin Bieber, became the second best selling single of this year, spending eleven non-consecutive weeks at number-one and eighteen weeks in the top 10 altogether.

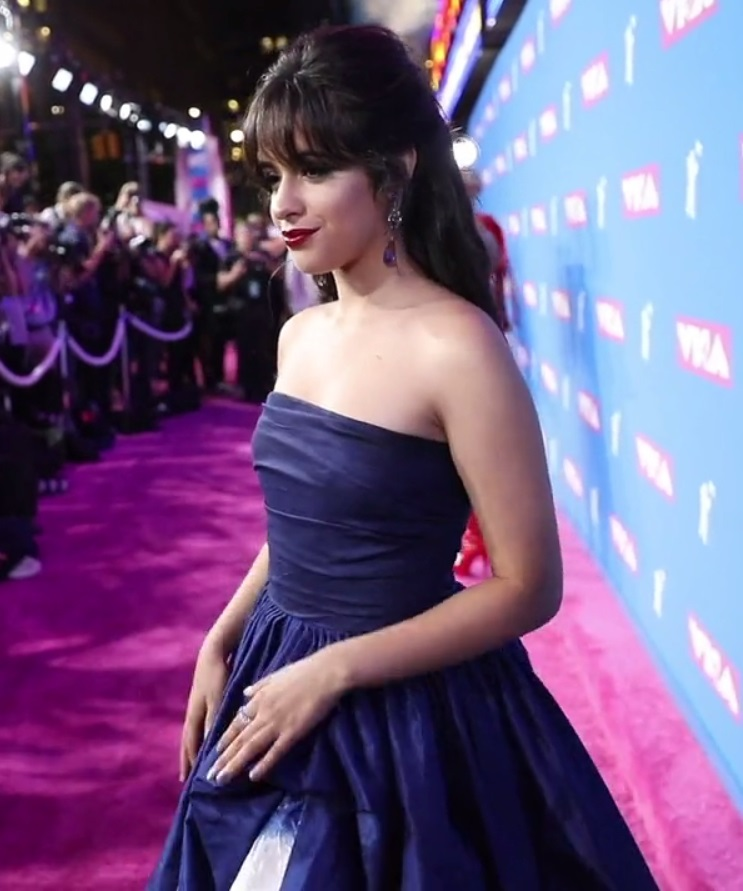
Former Fifth Harmony member Camila Cabello had her first solo top 10 hit in 2017 with "Havana", a collaboration with Young Thug, which spent five weeks at number-one.

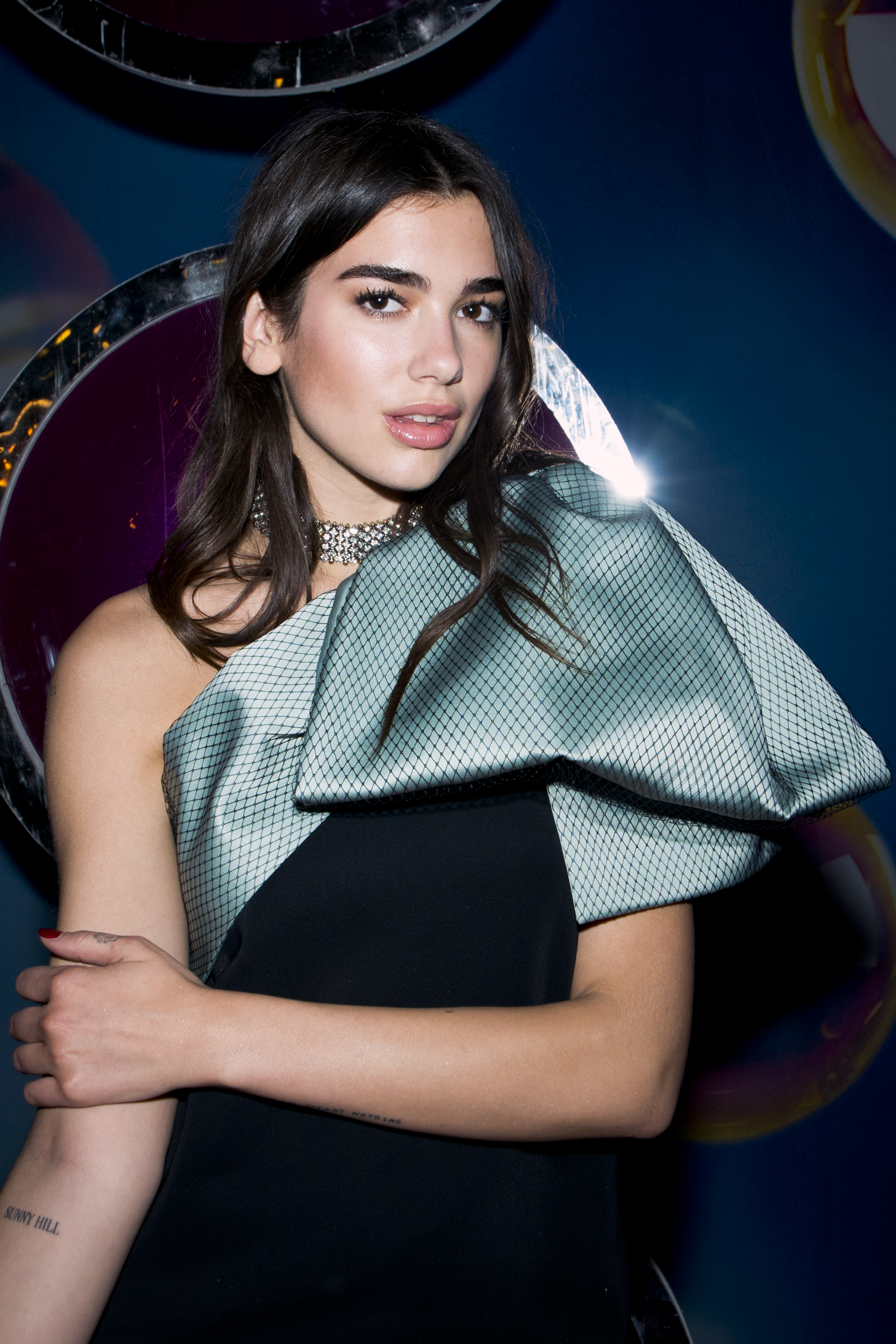
Dua Lipa made her top 10 debut this year with four singles making the countdown, including "New Rules", which spent two weeks at number-one in August.

The UK Singles Chart is one of many music charts compiled by the Official Charts Company that calculates the best-selling singles of the week in the United Kingdom. Since 2004 the chart has been based on the sales of both physical singles and digital downloads, with airplay figures excluded from the official chart. Since 2014, the singles chart has been based on both sales and streaming; in 2017 it used the ratio of 150 streams equivalent to one sale (not 100:1 as previously). This list shows singles that peaked in the Top 10 of the UK Singles Chart during 2017, as well as singles which peaked in 2016 and 2018 but were in the top 10 in 2017. The entry date is when the song appeared in the top 10 for the first time (week ending, as published by the Official Charts Company, which is six days after the chart is announced).

Ninety-eight singles were in the top ten this year. Eleven singles from 2016 remained in the top 10 for several weeks at the beginning of the year, while "Man's Not Hot" by Big Shaq, "I Miss You" by Clean Bandit featuring Julia Michaels, "River" by Eminem, "17" by MK and "Let You Down" by NF were released in 2017 but did not reach their peak until 2018. "Last Christmas" by Wham! and "Fairytale of New York" by The Pogues featuring Kirsty MacColl both re-entered the top ten at the end of the year after being re-issued and reached peaks on their current run in 2018. "I Would Like" by Zara Larsson was the only song from 2016 to reach its peak in 2017. Twenty-four artists scored multiple entries in the top 10 in 2017. Alessia Cara, DJ Khaled, Dua Lipa, Camila Cabello and Post Malone were among the many artists who achieved their first UK charting top 10 single in 2017.

The 2016 Christmas number-one, "Rockabye" by Clean Bandit featuring Anne-Marie and Sean Paul, remained at number-one for the first two weeks of 2017. The first new number-one single of the year was "Shape of You" by Ed Sheeran. Overall, fifteen different singles peaked at number-one in 2017, with Anne-Marie, Clean Bandit, DJ Khaled, Dua Lipa, Ed Sheeran and Justin Bieber (2) having the most singles hit that position.

== Background ==
=== Multiple entries ===
Ninety-eight singles charted in the top 10 in 2017, with eighty-two singles reaching their peak this year (including the re-entry "All I Want for Christmas" which charted in previous years but reached a peak on its latest chart run).

Twenty-four artists scored multiple entries in the top 10 in 2017. Ed Sheeran had the most top ten singles in 2017 with eleven. His comeback single "Shape of You" was made available for download on 6 January and has spent fourteen non-consecutive weeks at number-one while "Castle on the Hill", which came out on the same day, peaked at number two. Promotional single "How Would You Feel (Paean)" also reached a high of second in the chart on 2 March.

After Sheeran's third studio album, "÷" was released, all sixteen tracks were in the top 20 on the week ending 16 March, and he held nine of the top 10, with "Something Just Like This" by The Chainsmokers and Coldplay the only single to break this monopoly. In addition to the singles already in the chart, "Galway Girl (2), "Perfect" (4), "New Man" (5) "Happier" (6), "Dive" (8), and "Supermarket Flowers" (9, rising to 8) and "What Do I Know?" all reaching the top ten. In response, the Official Charts Company announced plans in June to limit the number of songs by the same artist in the chart at the same time, to reflect popularity of singles rather than album tracks. "Perfect" returned to the chart later in the year after its official single release and became the Christmas number-one, with Sheeran'/ collaboration with Eminem, "River", behind it in the chart. "River" would eventually reach the top spot itself in early 2018.

Dua Lipa had four top 10 entries in 2017 with "Be the One", "Bridge over Troubled Water", "New Rules" and "No Lie". Justin Bieber, Little Mix, Rita Ora and Stormzy also had four top 10 entries so far this year.

Drake is one of eight artists who had three hit singles in 2017. "Passionfruit" entered the chart at number 4 on 30 March and rose to number three the following week. Two of his other album tracks from More Life peaked in the top 10 - KMT featuring the rapper Giggs reached number 9 and "Blem" landed one place lower.

Anne-Marie, Clean Bandit, James Arthur, Louis Tomlinson, Quavo, Sean Paul and Taylor Swift all had three top 10 entries in 2017.

DJ Khaled is one of a number of artists with two top-ten entries, including number-one singles "I'm the One" and "Wild Thoughts". Charlie Puth, Eminem, Katy Perry, Selena Gomez and Zara Larsson were among the other artists with multiple top 10 entries in 2017.

=== All-female top 3 ===
"New Rules" by Dua Lipa became the first solo female UK number one since Adele reached number 1 in 2015 with "Hello". The top 3 singles on the chart on 7 September 2017 (week ending), was the first female top 3 since October 2014. The singles included "Look What You Made Me Do" by Taylor Swift at 1, "New Rules" by Dua Lipa at 2 and "What About Us" by Pink at 3.

=== Changes to chart rules ===
The Official Charts Company announced plans in June to limit the number of songs by the same artist in the chart at the same time, to reflect popularity of singles rather than album tracks. Chart rules were altered from 7 July to help new artists break through by limiting the number of tracks by the same artist allowed in the chart at the same time to 3. The streaming to sales ratio remained largely unchanged but for songs which have spent a high number of weeks in the chart the ratio was altered to 300:1. This was largely in response to Ed Sheeran's album tracks dominating the chart, with all sixteen tracks from his third studio album ÷, reaching the top twenty in the same week.

=== Chart debuts ===
Thirty-nine artists achieved their first top 10 single in 2017, either as a lead or featured artist. Of these, six went on to record another hit single that year: Alessia Cara, DJ Khaled, Julia Michaels, Khalid, Marshmello and Raye. Dua Lipa had three other entries in her breakthrough year.

The following table (collapsed on desktop site) does not include acts who had previously charted as part of a group and secured their first top 10 solo single.

Artist	Number of top 10s	First entry	Chart position	Other entries
Starley	1	"Call on Me"	6	—
Raye	2	"You Don't Know Me"	3	"Bridge over Troubled Water" (1)
Dua Lipa	4	"No Lie"	10	"Be the One" (9), "Bridge over Troubled Water" (1), "New Rules" (1)
Skip Marley	1	"Chained to the Rhythm"	5	—
Frank Ocean	1	"Slide"	10	—
Migos	1	"Slide"	10	—
Martin Jensen	1	"Solo Dance"	7	—
Giggs	1	"KMT"	9	—
Alessia Cara	2	"Stay"	8	"1-800-273-8255" (9)
Julia Michaels	2	"Issues"	10	"I Miss You" (4) ^{[OO]}
DJ Khaled	2	"I'm the One"	1	"Wild Thoughts" (1)
Luis Fonsi	1	"Despacito"	1	—
J Hus	1	"Did You See"	9	—
Captain SKA	1	"Liar Liar GE2017"	4	—
William Singe	1	"Mama"	4	—
Artists for Grenfell	1	"Bridge over Troubled Water"	1	—
5 After Midnight	1	"Bridge over Troubled Water"	1	—
Deno	1	"Bridge over Troubled Water"	1	—
Donae'o	1	"Bridge over Troubled Water"	1	—
Gregory Porter	1	"Bridge over Troubled Water"	1	—
Jorja Smith	1	"Bridge over Troubled Water"	1	—
Mr Eazi	1	"Bridge over Troubled Water"	1	—
Omar	1	"Bridge over Troubled Water"	1	—
Ray BLK	1	"Bridge over Troubled Water"	1	—
Tokio Myers	1	"Bridge over Troubled Water"	1	—
Tom Grennan	1	"Bridge over Troubled Water"	1	—
Bryson Tiller	1	"Wild Thoughts"	1	—
Maggie Lindemann	1	"Pretty Girl"	8	—
Digital Farm Animals	1	"Back to You"	8	—
BloodPop	1	"Friends"	2	—
CNCO	1	"Reggaetón Lento"	5	—
J Balvin	1	"Mi Gente"	5	—
Willy William	1	"Mi Gente"	5	—
James Hype	1	"More than Friends"	8	—
Kelli-Leigh	1	"More than Friends"	8	—
Young Thug	1	"Havana"	1	—
Post Malone	1	"Rockstar"	1	—
21 Savage	1	"Rockstar"	1	—
Logic	1	"1-800-273-8255"	9	—
Khalid	2	"1-800-273-8255"	9	"Silence" (3)
Yungen	1	"Bestie"	10	—
Yxng Bane	1	"Bestie"	10	—
Stefflon Don	1	"Hurtin' Me"	7	—
Marshmello	2	"Silence"	3	"Wolves" (9)
Mabel	1	"Finders Keepers"	8	—
Kojo Funds	1	"Finders Keepers"	8	—
Big Shaq	1	"Man's Not Hot" ^{[NN]}	3	—
Rak-Su	1	"Dimelo"	2	—
NF	1	"Let You Down" ^{[PP]}	6	—

Notes

Harry Styles made his solo debut in 2017, with his first single outside One Direction, "Sign of the Times", topping the chart in April. Likewise with Liam Payne, he made his solo debut in 2017, with his first single outside One Direction, "Strip That Down" entered the top 10 at number 3. Quavo is a member of the hip-hop group Migos, who debuted on the Calvin Harris single in "Slide" in March 2017, two months before he featured on DJ Khaled's number-one hit "I'm the One". He would also appear with Liam Payne on his solo top three single "Strip That Down".

Camila Cabello also made her first UK top 10 debut with Havana. This also became her first top 10 since her departure from US girl group Fifth Harmony. Swae Lee had his first chart single under his own name, featuring on French Montana's "Unforgettable". He previously charted as part of the duo Rae Sremmurd with "Black Beatles" in 2016.

Artists for Grenfell recorded a cover of "Bridge over Troubled Water" in aid of the Grenfell Tower fire and featured many artists who had achieved top 10 singles previously in their own right or with a band. Carl Barat of The Libertines, Jon McClure from Reverend and the Makers, Matt Goss from Bros., Kelly Jones of Stereophonics, The Who's Pete Townshend and former Westlife member Shane Filan all had their first credited top 10 hit independent of their bands with this song.

=== Songs from films ===
Original song "I Don't Wanna Live Forever" (from Fifty Shades Darker) was the only film soundtrack song that entered the top 10 this year.

=== Charity singles ===
The charity single "Bridge over Troubled Water" was dedicated to the victims and survivors of the Grenfell Tower fire. The single peaked at number 1 on 29 June 2017, just two days after release, becoming the second fastest selling single of 2017 behind "Shape of You".

=== Best-selling singles ===
Ed Sheeran had the best-selling and streamed single of the year with "Shape of You". The song spent twenty-two weeks in the top 10 (including fourteen weeks at number one), sold over 787,000 copies as well as scoring 248 million streams (3.2 million combined sales) and was certified 5× platinum by the BPI. "Despacito" by Luis Fonsi, Daddy Yankee & Justin Bieber came in second place with more than 2.3 million combined sales. Ed Sheeran's "Castle on the Hill", "Unforgettable" from French Montana featuring Swae Lee and "Galway Girl" by Ed Sheeran made up the top five. Singles by Ed Sheeran ("Perfect"), Clean Bandit featuring Zara Larsson, Rag'n'Bone Man, The Chainsmokers & Coldplay and Jax Jones featuring Raye were also in the top ten best-selling singles of the year.

== Top-ten singles ==
Key

Symbol	Meaning
‡	Single peaked in 2016 but still in chart in 2017.
♦	Single released in 2017 but peaked in 2018.
(#)	Year-end top-ten single position and rank
Entered	The date that the single first appeared in the chart.
Peak	Highest position that the single reached in the UK Singles Chart.

Entered (week ending)	Weeks in top 10	Single	Artist	Peak	Peak reached (week ending)	Weeks at peak
Singles in 2016
29 September 2016	16	"Say You Won't Let Go" ‡	James Arthur	1	6 October 2016	3
6 October 2016	15	"Starboy" ‡	The Weeknd featuring Daft Punk	2	13 October 2016	1
20 October 2016	9	"24K Magic" ‡ ^{[A]}	Bruno Mars	5	17 November 2016	1
27 October 2016	11	"Shout Out to My Ex" ‡ ^{[B]}	Little Mix	1	27 October 2016	3
3 November 2016	9	"Sexual" ‡ ^{[D]}	Neiked featuring Dyo	5	15 December 2016	1
3 November 2016	15	"Rockabye" ‡	Clean Bandit featuring Sean Paul & Anne-Marie	1	17 November 2016	9
15 December 2016	8	"All I Want for Christmas Is You" ^{[KK]}	Mariah Carey	2	21 December 2017	1
15 December 2016	13	"Human" ‡ (#8)	Rag'n'Bone Man	2	29 December 2016	3
22 December 2016	4	"Just Hold On" ‡ ^{[E]}	Steve Aoki & Louis Tomlinson	2	22 December 2016	1
29 December 2016	10	"Touch" ‡	Little Mix	4	29 December 2016	6
29 December 2016	6	"I Would Like"	Zara Larsson	2	5 January 2017	1
Singles in 2017
5 January 2017	5	"Last Christmas" ♦ ^{[C]}	Wham!	2	4 January 2018	1
19 January 2017	22	"Shape of You" (#1)	Ed Sheeran	1	19 January 2017	14
19 January 2017	14	"Castle on the Hill" (#3)	Ed Sheeran	2	19 January 2017	5
19 January 2017	4	"September Song"	JP Cooper	7	19 January 2017	1
19 January 2017	6	"Call on Me"	Starley	6	2 February 2017	2
19 January 2017	8	"You Don't Know Me" (#10)	Jax Jones featuring Raye	3	2 February 2017	3
26 January 2017	7	"Paris"	The Chainsmokers	5	9 February 2017	1
9 February 2017	1	"No Lie"	Sean Paul featuring Dua Lipa	10	9 February 2017	1
16 February 2017	2	"Big for Your Boots" ^{[F]}	Stormzy	6	9 March 2017	1
16 February 2017	3	"I Don't Wanna Live Forever"	Zayn & Taylor Swift	5	23 February 2017	1
16 February 2017	2	"Be the One"	Dua Lipa	9	23 February 2017	1
23 February 2017	3	"Chained to the Rhythm"	Katy Perry featuring Skip Marley	5	2 March 2017	2
2 March 2017	1	"How Would You Feel (Paean)"	Ed Sheeran	2	2 March 2017	1
2 March 2017	5	"It Ain't Me" ^{[G]}	Kygo & Selena Gomez	7	9 March 2017	3
9 March 2017	9	"Something Just Like This" (#9)	The Chainsmokers & Coldplay	2	9 March 2017	1
9 March 2017	1	"Slide"	Calvin Harris featuring Frank Ocean & Migos	10	9 March 2017	1
16 March 2017	11	"Galway Girl" (#5)	Ed Sheeran	2	16 March 2017	5
16 March 2017	17	"Perfect" (#6) ^{[FF]}^{[LL]}	Ed Sheeran	1	14 December 2017	6
16 March 2017	2	"New Man"	Ed Sheeran	5	16 March 2017	1
16 March 2017	2	"Happier"	Ed Sheeran	6	16 March 2017	1
16 March 2017	2	"Dive"	Ed Sheeran	8	16 March 2017	1
16 March 2017	2	"Supermarket Flowers"	Ed Sheeran	8	23 March 2017	1
16 March 2017	2	"What Do I Know?"	Ed Sheeran	9	23 March 2017	1
30 March 2017	7	"Passionfruit"	Drake	3	6 April 2017	1
30 March 2017	12	"Symphony" (#7)	Clean Bandit featuring Zara Larsson	1	4 May 2017	1
30 March 2017	8	"Solo Dance"	Martin Jensen	7	20 April 2017	1
30 March 2017	1	"KMT"	Drake featuring Giggs	9	30 March 2017	1
30 March 2017	2	"Ciao Adios"	Anne-Marie	9	6 April 2017	1
6 April 2017	1	"Blem"	Drake	10	6 April 2017	1
13 April 2017	3	"Stay"	Zedd & Alessia Cara	8	20 April 2017	1
13 April 2017	2	"Issues" ^{[H]}	Julia Michaels	10	13 April 2017	2
20 April 2017	7	"Sign of the Times"	Harry Styles	1	20 April 2017	1
27 April 2017	2	"Humble"	Kendrick Lamar	6	27 April 2017	1
4 May 2017	5	"Swalla"	Jason Derulo featuring Nicki Minaj & Ty Dolla Sign	6	4 May 2017	2
4 May 2017	8	"There's Nothing Holdin' Me Back"	Shawn Mendes	4	25 May 2017	2
11 May 2017	9	"I'm the One"	DJ Khaled featuring Justin Bieber, Quavo, Chance the Rapper & Lil Wayne	1	11 May 2017	1
11 May 2017	18	"Despacito" (#2)	Luis Fonsi & Daddy Yankee featuring Justin Bieber	1	18 May 2017	11
18 May 2017	15	"Unforgettable" (#4)	French Montana featuring Swae Lee	2	17 August 2017	1
25 May 2017	1	"Did You See"	J Hus	9	25 May 2017	1
1 June 2017	9	"Strip That Down"	Liam Payne featuring Quavo	3	1 June 2017	2
1 June 2017	3	"Attention" ^{[I]}	Charlie Puth	9	1 June 2017	1
8 June 2017	1	"Liar Liar GE2017"	Captain SKA	4	8 June 2017	1
8 June 2017	11	"Mama"	Jonas Blue featuring William Singe	4	13 July 2017	1
15 June 2017	3	"One Last Time"	Ariana Grande	2	15 June 2017	2
15 June 2017	2	"Slow Hands"	Niall Horan	7	15 June 2017	1
22 June 2017	5	"2U" ^{[U]}	David Guetta featuring Justin Bieber	5	22 June 2017	1
29 June 2017	2	"Bridge over Troubled Water" ^{[Q]}	Artists for Grenfell	1	29 June 2017	1
29 June 2017	9	"Wild Thoughts"	DJ Khaled featuring Rihanna & Bryson Tiller	1	27 July 2017	1
29 June 2017	8	"Power"	Little Mix featuring Stormzy	6	3 August 2017	2
6 July 2017	7	"Your Song" ^{[Y]}	Rita Ora	7	13 July 2017	3
13 July 2017	9	"Feels"	Calvin Harris featuring Pharrell Williams, Katy Perry & Big Sean	1	17 August 2017	1
13 July 2017	4	"Pretty Girl"	Maggie Lindemann	8	3 August 2017	1
20 July 2017	5	"Came Here for Love" ^{[W]}	Sigala & Ella Eyre	6	20 July 2017	1
3 August 2017	7	"Sun Comes Up"	Rudimental featuring James Arthur	6	17 August 2017	3
10 August 2017	11	"New Rules"	Dua Lipa	1	24 August 2017	2
17 August 2017	1	"Súbeme la Radio"	Enrique Iglesias featuring Sean Paul & Matt Terry	10	17 August 2017	1
24 August 2017	8	"What About Us"	Pink	3	7 September 2017	3
24 August 2017	2	"Back to You"	Louis Tomlinson featuring Bebe Rexha & Digital Farm Animals	8	24 August 2017	1
31 August 2017	5	"Friends"	Justin Bieber & BloodPop	2	31 August 2017	1
31 August 2017	11	"Reggaetón Lento" ^{[GG]}	CNCO & Little Mix	5	31 August 2017	3
31 August 2017	7	"Mi Gente" ^{[CC]}	J Balvin & Willy William	5	14 September 2017	1
31 August 2017	5	"More than Friends" ^{[AA]}	James Hype featuring Kelli-Leigh	8	7 September 2017	3
7 September 2017	5	"Look What You Made Me Do"	Taylor Swift	1	7 September 2017	2
14 September 2017	2	"...Ready for It?"	Taylor Swift	7	14 September 2017	1
14 September 2017	1	"Sorry Not Sorry"	Demi Lovato	9	14 September 2017	1
21 September 2017	12	"Too Good at Goodbyes"	Sam Smith	1	21 September 2017	3
21 September 2017	11	"Dusk Till Dawn"	Zayn featuring Sia	5	21 September 2017	2
21 September 2017	15	"Havana"	Camila Cabello featuring Young Thug	1	9 November 2017	5
28 September 2017	10	"Rockstar"	Post Malone featuring 21 Savage	1	12 October 2017	4
28 September 2017	8	"Lonely Together"	Avicii featuring Rita Ora	4	26 October 2017	3
12 October 2017	2	"1-800-273-8255"	Logic featuring Alessia Cara & Khalid	9	12 October 2017	1
12 October 2017	1	"Bestie"	Yungen featuring Yxng Bane	10	12 October 2017	1
19 October 2017	2	"Hurtin' Me"	Stefflon Don featuring French Montana	7	26 October 2017	1
26 October 2017	9	"Silence"	Marshmello featuring Khalid	3	2 November 2017	3
26 October 2017	5	"Finders Keepers"	Mabel featuring Kojo Funds	8	2 November 2017	2
9 November 2017	1	"How Long"	Charlie Puth	9	9 November 2017	1
16 November 2017	11	"Anywhere"	Rita Ora	2	23 November 2017	3
23 November 2017	1	"Walk on Water"	Eminem featuring Beyoncé	7	23 November 2017	1
23 November 2017	9	"Man's Not Hot"♦	Big Shaq	3	11 January 2018	1
30 November 2017	2	"Blinded by Your Grace, Pt. 2"	Stormzy featuring MNEK	7	30 November 2017	1
30 November 2017	3	"Wolves"	Selena Gomez & Marshmello	9	30 November 2017	3
7 December 2017	7	"I Miss You"♦	Clean Bandit featuring Julia Michaels	4	25 January 2018	1
7 December 2017	3	"17"♦	MK	7	11 January 2018	1
14 December 2017	3	"Dimelo"	Rak-Su featuring Wyclef Jean & Naughty Boy	2	14 December 2017	1
14 December 2017	4	"Fairytale of New York"♦ ^{[JJ]}	The Pogues featuring Kirsty MacColl	5	4 January 2018	1
28 December 2017	9	"River"♦	Eminem featuring Ed Sheeran	1	25 January 2018	1
28 December 2017	4	"Let You Down"♦	NF	6	18 January 2018	1

== Entries by artist ==
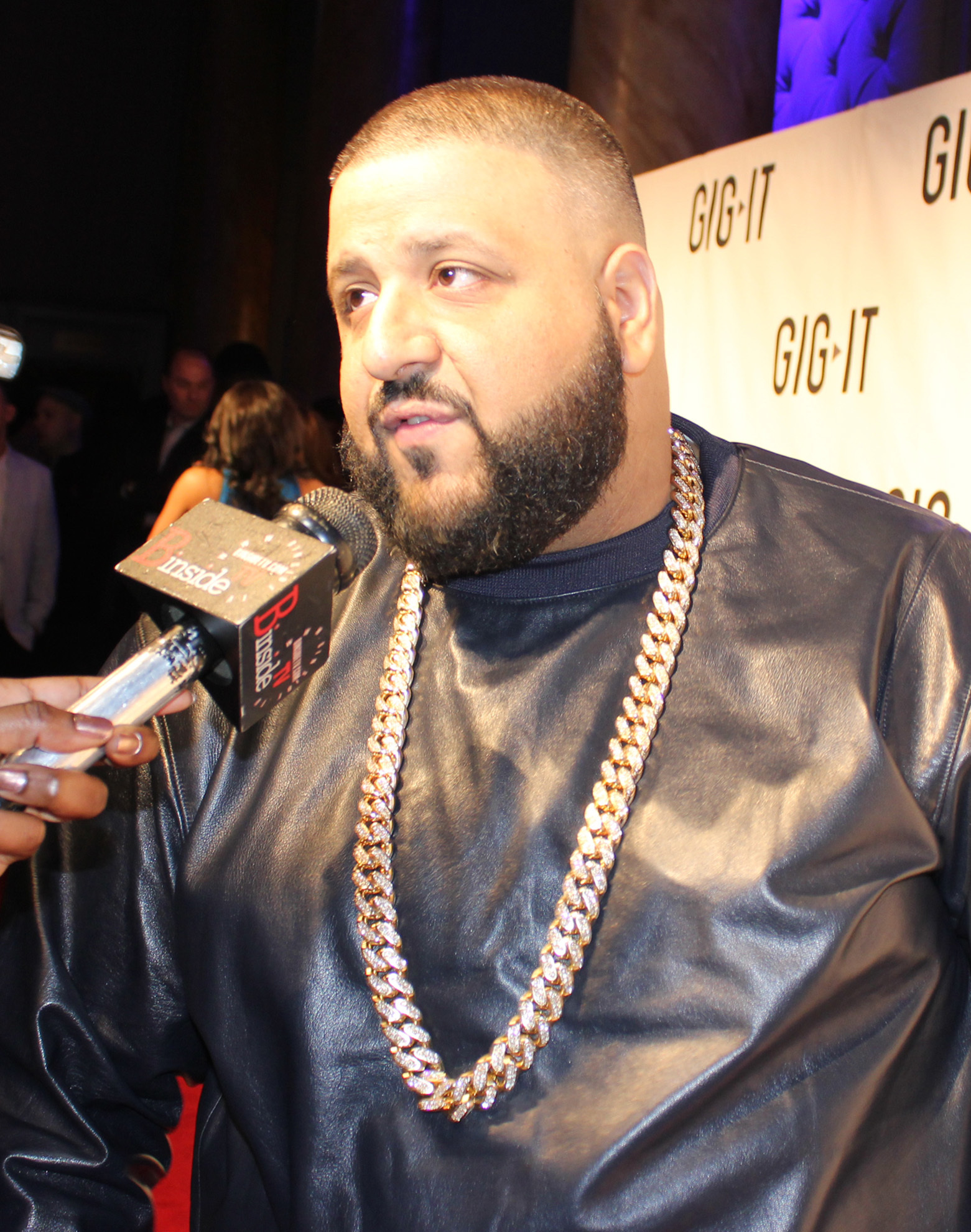
DJ Khaled (pictured in 2012) reached the UK top 10 for the first time in May 2017 with the chart-topping "I'm the One", alongside Justin Bieber, Chance the Rapper, Lil Wayne and Quavo. A second collaboration, "Wild Thoughts" with Rihanna and Bryson Tiller, also made number-one for one week in July.

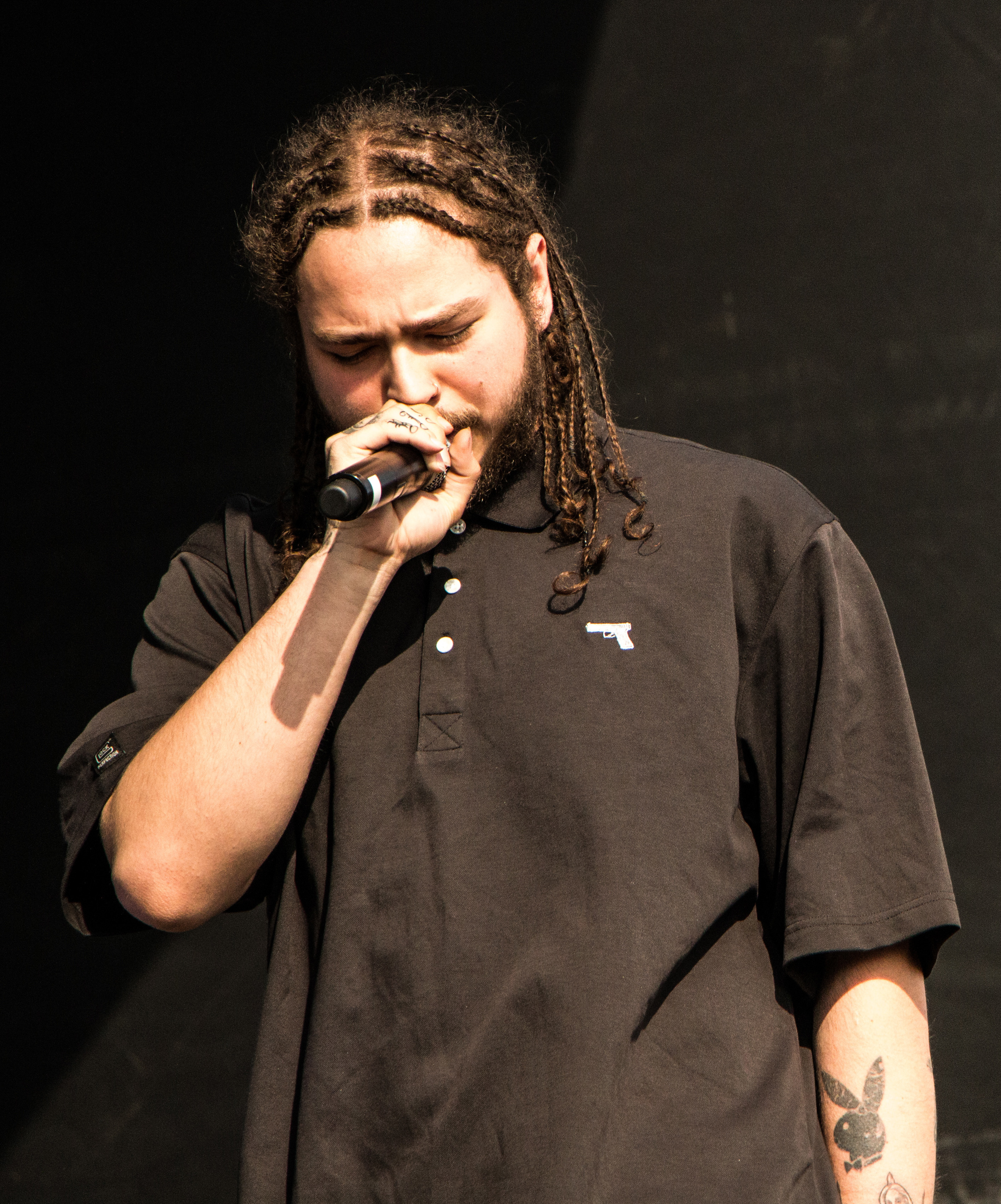
Post Malone made his UK top 10 debut in September of this year with "Rockstar", a collaboration with fellow rapper 21 Savage, which spent four weeks at number-one.

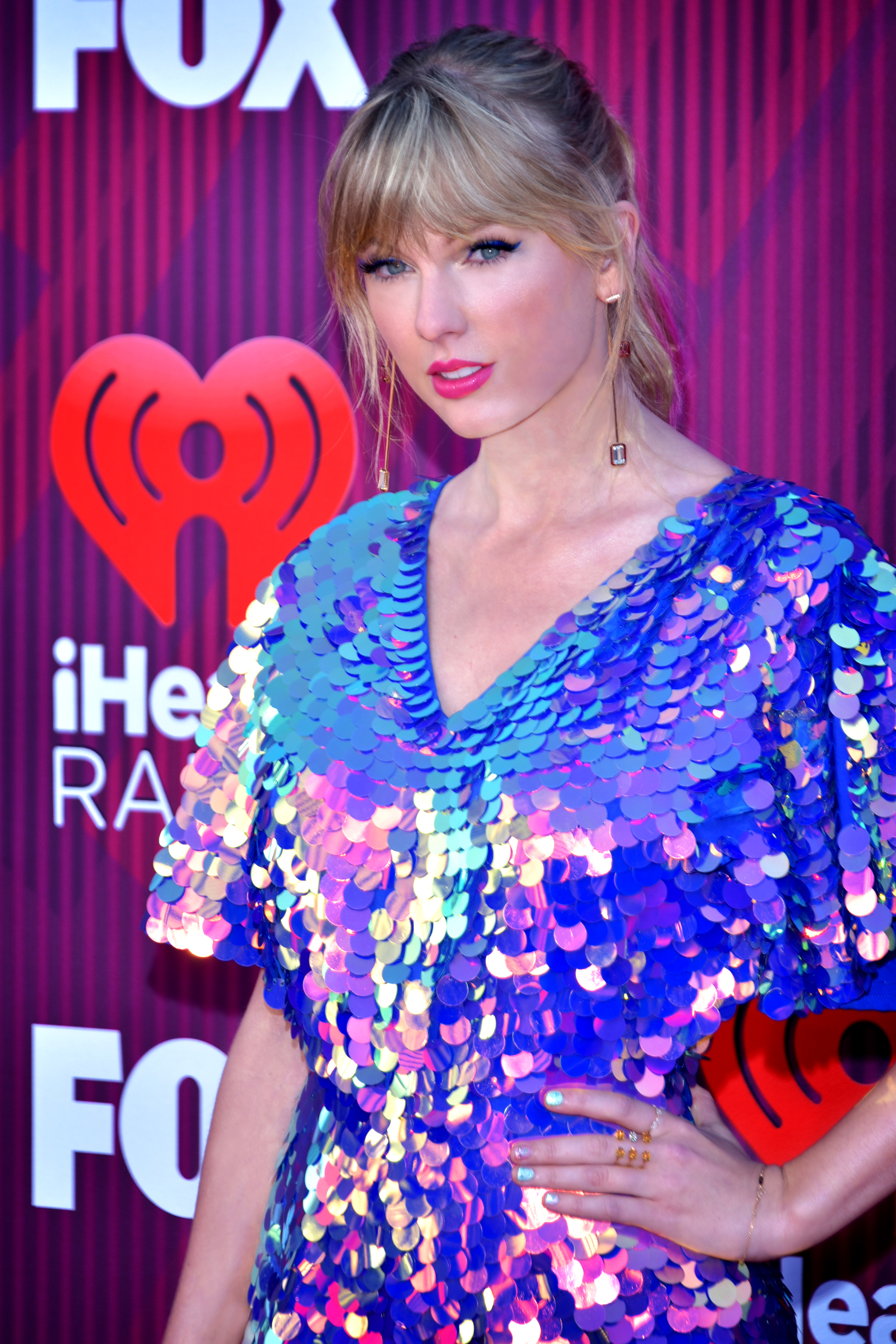
Taylor Swift made the top 10 three times in 2017, notably with "Look What You Made Me Do", which became her first UK number-one single.

The following table shows artists who achieved two or more top 10 entries in 2017, including singles that reached their peak in 2016. The figures include both main artists and featured artists, while appearances on ensemble charity records are also counted for each artist. The total number of weeks an artist spent in the top ten in 2017 is also shown.

Entries	Artist	Weeks	Songs
11	Ed Sheeran ^{[MM]}	30	"Castle on the Hill", "Dive", "Galway Girl", "Happier", "How Would You Feel (Paean)", "New Man", "Perfect", "River", "Shape of You", "Supermarket Flowers", "What Do I Know?"
4	Dua Lipa ^{[J]}^{[L]}^{[P]}	15	"Be the One", "Bridge over Troubled Water", "New Rules", "No Lie"
4	Justin Bieber ^{[M]}	22	"2U", "Despacito", "Friends", "I'm the One"
4	Little Mix ^{[J]}	29	"Power", "Reggaetón Lento", "Shout Out to My Ex", "Touch"
4	Rita Ora ^{[P]}^{[Z]}	20	"Anywhere", "Bridge over Troubled Water", "Lonely Together", "Your Song"
4	Stormzy ^{[P]}^{[R]}	10	"Big for Your Boots", "Blinded by Your Grace, Pt. 2", "Bridge over Troubled Water", "Power"
3	Anne-Marie ^{[J]}^{[K]}^{[P]}	10	"Bridge over Troubled Water", "Ciao Adios", "Rockabye"
3	Clean Bandit ^{[J]}	22	"I Miss You", "Rockabye", "Symphony"
3	Drake	9	"Blem", "KMT", "Passionfruit"
3	James Arthur ^{[J]}^{[P]}	9	"Bridge over Troubled Water", "Say You Won't Let Go", "Sun Comes Up"
3	Louis Tomlinson ^{[J]}^{[P]}	6	"Back to You", "Bridge over Troubled Water", "Just Hold On"
3	Quavo ^{[N]}	19	"I'm the One", "Slide", "Strip That Down"
3	Sean Paul ^{[J]}^{[K]}^{[X]}	8	"No Lie", "Rockabye", "Súbeme la Radio"
3	Taylor Swift	8	"I Don't Wanna Live Forever", "Look What You Made Me Do", "...Ready for It?"
2	Alessia Cara ^{[BB]}	5	"1-800-273-8255", "Stay"
2	Calvin Harris	10	"Feels", "Slide"
2	The Chainsmokers	16	"Paris", "Something Just Like This"
2	Charlie Puth	4	"Attention", "How Long"
2	DJ Khaled	17	"I'm the One", "Wild Thoughts"
2	Ella Eyre ^{[P]}	7	"Bridge over Troubled Water", "Came Here for Love"
2	Eminem	4	"River", "Walk on Water"
2	French Montana ^{[DD]}	17	"Hurtin' Me", "Unforgettable"
2	Julia Michaels ^{[HH]}	5	"I Miss You", "Issues"
2	Katy Perry ^{[T]}	12	"Chained to the Rhythm", "Feels"
2	Khalid ^{[EE]}	9	"1-800-273-8255", "Silence"
2	Liam Payne ^{[P]}	11	"Bridge over Troubled Water", "Strip That Down"
2	Marshmello	8	"Silence", "Wolves"
2	Matt Terry ^{[P]}^{[X]}	3	"Bridge over Troubled Water", "Súbeme la Radio"
2	Raye ^{[P]}^{[S]}	10	"Bridge over Troubled Water", "You Don't Know Me"
2	Selena Gomez	7	"It Ain't Me", "Wolves"
2	Zara Larsson ^{[O]}^{[V]}	17	"I Would Like", "Symphony"
2	Zayn	14	"Dusk Till Dawn", "I Don't Wanna Live Forever"

== Notes ==
- ^{a} "24K Magic" re-entered the top 10 at number 10 on 5 January 2017 (week ending).
- ^{b} "Shout Out to My Ex" re-entered the top 10 at number 6 on 5 January 2017 (week ending).
- ^{c} "Last Christmas" re-entered the top 10 at number 7 on 5 January 2017 (week ending) following the death of George Michael, having originally peaked at number 2 upon release in 1984. It re-entered the top 10 again on 14 December 2017 at number 6.
- ^{d} "Sexual" re-entered the top 10 at number 6 on 12 January 2017 (week ending).
- ^{e} "Just Hold On" re-entered the top 10 at number 10 on 12 January 2017 (week ending).
- ^{f} "Big For Your Boots" re-entered the top 10 at number 6 on 9 March 2017 (week ending).
- ^{g} "It Ain't Me" re-entered the top 10 at number 7 on 6 April 2017 (week ending).
- ^{h} "Issues" re-entered the top 10 at number 10 on 27 April 2017 (week ending).
- ^{i} "Attention" re-entered the top 10 at number 10 on 22 June 2017 (week ending).
- ^{j} Figure includes song that peaked in 2016.
- ^{k} Figure includes appearance on Clean Bandit's "Rockabye".
- ^{l} Figure includes appearance on Sean Paul's "No Lie".
- ^{m} Figure includes appearances on Luis Fonsi's "Despacito", DJ Khaled's "I'm the One" and David Guetta's "2U".
- ^{n} Figure includes appearances on DJ Khaled's "I'm the One", Calvin Harris' "Slide" (with Migos) and Liam Payne's "Strip That Down".
- ^{o} Figure includes appearance on Clean Bandit's "Symphony".
- ^{p} Figure includes an appearance on the "Bridge over Troubled Water" charity single by Artists for Grenfell.
- ^{q} Released as a charity single by Artists for Grenfell to support survivors of the Grenfell Tower fire.
- ^{r} Figure includes appearance on Little Mix's "Power".
- ^{s} Figure includes appearance on Jax Jones' "You Don't Know Me".
- ^{t} Figure includes appearance on Calvin Harris' "Feels".
- ^{u} "2U" re-entered the top 10 at number 10 on 27 June 2017 (week ending).
- ^{v} Figure includes song that first charted in 2016 but peaked in 2017.
- ^{w} "Came Here for Love" re-entered the top 10 at number 9 on 3 August 2017 (week ending).
- ^{x} Figure includes appearance on Enrique Iglasias' "Súbeme la Radio".
- ^{y} "Your Song" re-entered the top 10 at number 10 on 24 August 2017 (week ending).
- ^{z} Figure includes appearance on Avicii's "Lonely Together".
- ^{aa} "More Than Friends" re-entered the top 10 at number 10 on 5 October 2017 (week ending).
- ^{bb} Figure includes appearance on Logic's "1-800-273-8255".
- ^{cc} "Mi Gente" re-entered the top 10 at number 8 on 19 October 2017 (week ending) upon the release of the remix featuring Beyoncé.
- ^{dd} Figure includes appearance on Stefflon Don's "Hurtin' Me".
- ^{ee} Figure includes appearance on Logic's "1-800-273-8255", and Marshmello's "Silence".
- ^{ff} "Perfect" re-entered the top 10 at number 7 on 2 November 2017 (week ending).
- ^{gg} "Reggaetón Lento" re-entered the top 10 at number 9 on 16 November 2017 (week ending).
- ^{hh} Figure includes appearance on Clean Bandit's "I Miss You".
- ^{ii} "Last Christmas" re-entered the top 10 at number 6 on 14 December 2017 (week ending), having originally peaked at number 2 upon release in 1984.
- ^{jj} "Fairytale of New York" re-entered the top 10 at number 10 on 14 December 2017 (week ending), having originally peaked at number 2 upon release in 1987.
- ^{kk} "All I Want For Christmas" re-entered the top 10 at number 5 on 14 December 2017 (week ending), having originally peaked at number 2 upon release in 1994.
- ^{ll} "Perfect" reached a new peak at number 1 on 14 December 2017 upon the release of the remix featuring Beyoncé.
- ^{mm} Figure includes appearance on Eminem's "River".
- ^{nn} "Man's Not Hot" reached its peak of number three on 11 January 2018 (week ending).
- ^{oo} "I Miss You" reached its peak of number four on 25 January 2018 (week ending).
- ^{pp} "Let You Down" reached its peak of number six on 18 January 2018 (week ending).

== See also ==
- 2017 in British music
- List of number-one singles from the 2010s (UK)
