= Mind on It =

Single by Yungen featuring Jess Glynne
- Released: 16 March 2018
- Length: 3:11
- Label: RCA; Sony
- Songwriter(s): Yungen

Yungen singles chronology
"Bestie" (2017)	"Mind on It" (2018)	"Pricey" (2018)

Jess Glynne singles chronology
"These Days" (2018)	"Mind on It" (2018)	"I'll Be There" (2018)

Music video
- "Mind on It" on YouTube

"Mind on It" is a song by Yungen featuring vocals from British singer Jess Glynne. It was released as a digital download on 16 March 2018. The song peaked at number 47 on the UK Singles Chart.

== Background ==
Talking to the Official Charts Company, Yungen said: "Every track I've done with a feature before has been with a male artist, so I knew that when I did one with a female, it had to be someone I was genuinely a fan of, someone who I think, woah, I can't believe I've got you on this track. I let my team reach out instead of me, because if she [Jess Glynne] said no to them and not me, it wouldn't hurt as much [laughs]. But she was up for it. Then we got in the studio and she is such a cool girl to work with – she's in this for the music."

== Charts ==
Chart performance for "Mind on It"
Chart (2018)	Peak position
UK Singles (OCC)	47
UK Hip Hop/R&B (OCC)	27
