= I Don't Wanna Live Forever =

2016 single by Zayn and Taylor Swift

Single by Zayn and Taylor Swift

from the album Fifty Shades Darker: Original Motion Picture Soundtrack
- Released: December 9, 2016
- Studio: Rough Costumer (Brooklyn); Record Plant (Los Angeles)
- Genre: R&B; dance-pop; electropop
- Length: 4:05
- Label: Universal
- Songwriters: Taylor Swift; Sam Dew; Jack Antonoff
- Producer: Jack Antonoff

Zayn singles chronology
"Freedun" (2016)	"I Don't Wanna Live Forever" (2016)	"Still Got Time" (2017)

Taylor Swift singles chronology
"New Romantics" (2016)	"I Don't Wanna Live Forever" (2016)	"Look What You Made Me Do" (2017)

Music video
- "I Don't Wanna Live Forever" on YouTube

"I Don't Wanna Live Forever" (also subtitled "Fifty Shades Darker") is a song by the English singer Zayn and the American singer-songwriter Taylor Swift from the 2017 soundtrack Fifty Shades Darker: Original Motion Picture Soundtrack. It was written by Swift, Sam Dew, and its producer Jack Antonoff. An R&B, dance-pop, and electropop ballad about romantic yearning between two ex-lovers, "I Don't Wanna Live Forever" features finger snap beats and falsetto vocals from Swift and Zayn. Universal Music Group released it as a single on December 9, 2016, and its music video was released on January 27, 2017.

Music critics generally praised the duo's vocals and the sultry production. Several critics have nonetheless regarded "I Don't Wanna Live Forever" as one of Swift's lesser tracks. In the United States, "I Don't Wanna Live Forever" peaked at number two on the Billboard Hot 100 to become the highest-peaking song from the Fifty Shades film series, and it was certified four-times platinum by the Recording Industry Association of America for selling over four million units. It reached the top five on charts of many countries across Europe and has been certified diamond in Brazil, France, and Poland, and multi-platinum in many other territories.

Directed by Grant Singer, the music video for "I Don't Wanna Live Forever" features Zayn and Swift smashing objects in a hotel room. At the 60th Annual Grammy Awards in 2018, "I Don't Wanna Live Forever" was nominated for Best Song Written for Visual Media. It won Best Collaboration at the 2017 MTV Video Music Awards, Best Collaboration of the Year at the 2017 MTV Millennial Awards, and an iHeartRadio Titanium Award for amassing one billion spins. Swift performed "I Don't Wanna Live Forever" live during several concerts in 2017 and on four shows of the Eras Tour in 2023 and 2024.

== Background and release ==
Due to her close friendship with Lena Dunham, Taylor Swift was able to listen to and express her interest in an initial version of Zayn's track "I Don't Wanna Live Forever", which was produced by Dunham's then-boyfriend Jack Antonoff. Upon hearing this, Zayn invited Swift to collaborate with him via a phone call. Contributing lyrics to the track, Swift worked alongside Sam Dew and Antonoff to record "I Don't Wanna Live Forever" for the Fifty Shades Darker: Original Motion Picture Soundtrack (2017). It was Swift's first original song since her 2014 studio album, 1989.

Swift's vocals were recorded by Antonoff at Rough Customer Studio in Brooklyn, New York City, while Zayn's vocals were recorded by Daniel Zaidenstadt at the Record Plant in Los Angeles, California. All instruments were played by Antonoff, and the track was mixed by Serban Ghenea at MixStar Studios in Virginia Beach, Virginia. According to Antonoff, it took him one week to put the track together, combining Swift's vocals that he recorded and Zayn's vocals sent from Los Angeles. The track was mastered by Tom Coyne at Sterling Sound Studio in New York.

Universal Music Group released "I Don't Wanna Live Forever" for download onto the iTunes Store and streaming onto Apple Music on December 9, 2016, as the soundtrack's lead single. It was released to US hot adult contemporary radio on December 12 and US contemporary hit radio on December 13, through Big Machine and Republic Records. The song was made available for streaming onto Spotify on December 16. In Italy, Universal and Sony Music Italy released the song for radio airplay on January 13, 2017.

== Composition ==
"I Don't Wanna Live Forever" is 4 minutes and 5 seconds long. It is a mid-tempo R&B, electropop, and dance-pop ballad driven by finger snap beats. Issy Sampson of The Guardian categorized it as a slow jam. Many critics regarded the production as sultry. Swift and Zayn sung the track using breathy vocals and falsetto harmonies. The lyrics are about romantic yearning between two ex-lovers and include self-interrogation about what the relationship means; Swift's narrator sings at one point: "Wonder if I dodged a bullet?/ or just lost the love of my life?" Some lyrics were influenced by the dynamics of the Fifty Shades characters Christian Grey and Anastasia Steele ("I've been looking sad in all the nicest places").

== Critical reception ==
Nolan Feeney of Entertainment Weekly gave "I Don't Wanna Live Forever" a B+ rating. He contended that Swift succeeded in showing her sensual, sultry side and Zayn's falsetto vocals were impressive. Sampson thought that the single continued the trend of "soundtracks that are better than the actual film", highlighting Swift's vocals for reaching "notes she hardly ever attempts" and the finger snap production as "on-brand" for the Fifty Shades franchise. Hannah Mylrea of NME thought that the track was more enticing than the Fifty Shades movie and described it as "a bit of a banger". In June 2022, Business Insider ranked "I Don't Wanna Live Forever" as Swift's second-best soundtrack song, behind "Safe & Sound" (2012). Billboard in April 2024 ranked the single as Swift's second-best collaboration, behind "Exile" (2020) featuring Bon Iver, opining that Swift and Zayn gave the track enough character for it to become more than just a soundtrack single.

In a less enthusiastic review, Rob Sheffield of Rolling Stone ranked it 251st out of Swift's total 274 songs as of April 2024, deeming the track uninteresting and Swift and Zayn's vocals boring. Vulture's Nate Jones listed it at number 203 on his ranking of Swift's 245 songs as of April 2024, calling it a "wan duet". Lucy Ford of British GQ also deemed "I Don't Wanna Live Forever" a lesser entry among Swift's singles, saying that its "harsh falsetto and whimper of a crescendo" made it fall flat.

== Commercial performance ==
In the United States, "I Don't Wanna Live Forever" debuted at number six on the Billboard Hot 100, one of the few record charts in the world to combine sales and streaming with airplay data. On the chart, it became Zayn's second top-10 single as a solo artist and Swift's 20th top 10. On the Digital Song Sales chart, it debuted at number one, becoming Zayn's second song as a solo artist and Swift's 11th song to reach number one. The single peaked at number two on the Billboard Hot 100 chart dated March 4, 2017, becoming the highest-charting single from the Fifty Shades franchise, surpassing Ellie Goulding's "Love Me like You Do" (2015) and the Weeknd's "Earned It" (2014), which both peaked at number three. It was Zayn's second top-five single as solo artist and Swift's 11th top-five single on the Hot 100. On Billboard's airplay charts, the single peaked at number two on both Adult Top 40 and Mainstream Top 40. It reached over a million in sales by July 2017 and 1.4 million by November 2017, and was the tenth-best-selling song of 2017 in the United States, selling 1.108 million copies within that year. The Recording Industry Association of America has certified the single four-times platinum for surpassing four million units.

"I Don't Wanna Live Forever" made the top-five of the sales-and-streaming charts in several countries across Asia-Pacific and Europe, including the United Kingdom where it peaked at number five on the UK Singles Chart and was certified double platinum. As of 2024, it is Swift's tenth best-performer on the chart, with 1.3 million chart units. It was number-one for the last week of 2016 on the Swedish sales-and-streaming sale, and the song was certified double platinum in the country.

== Music video ==
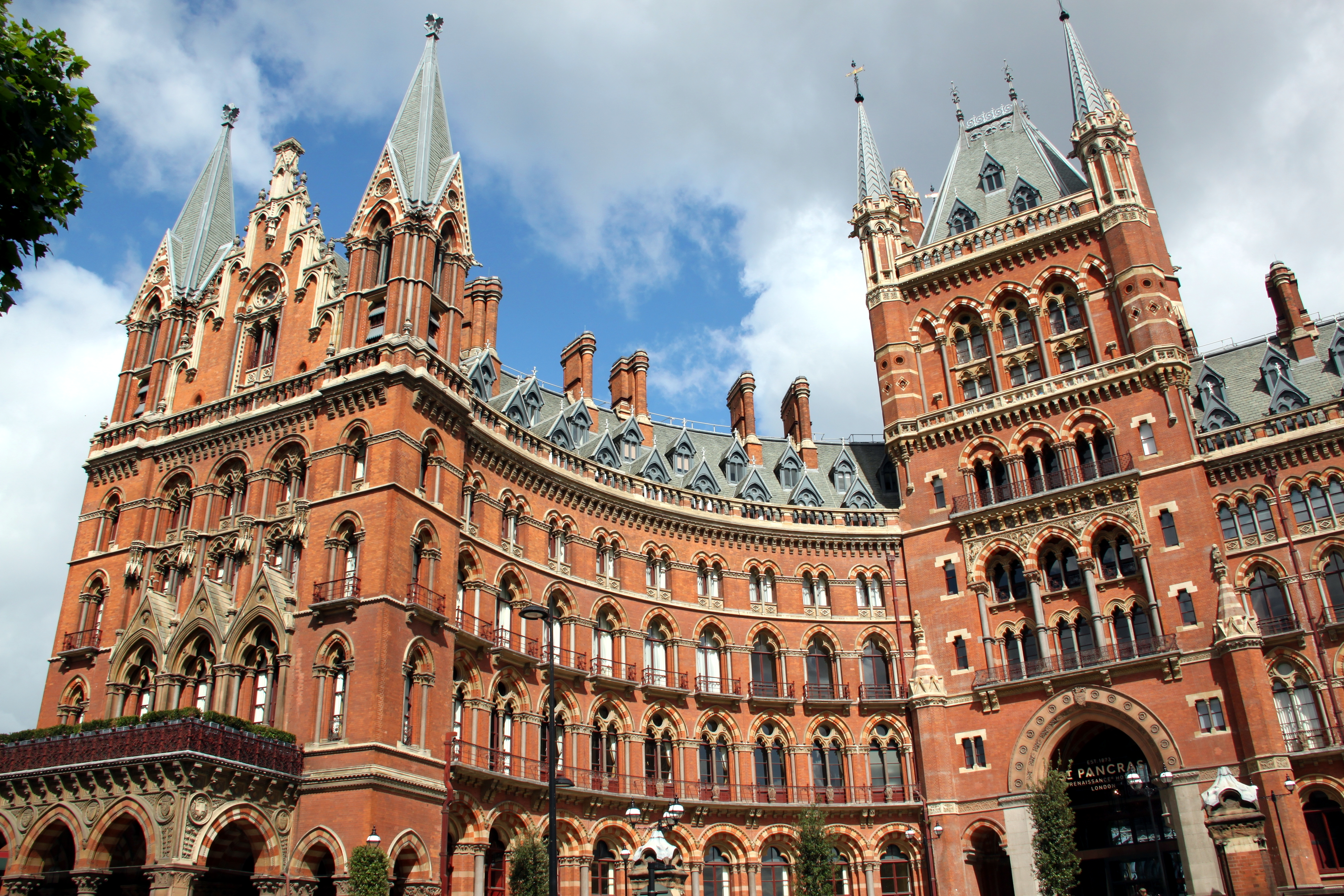
The video was shot at the St Pancras Renaissance London Hotel (exterior pictured).

Directed by Grant Singer, the music video for "I Don't Wanna Live Forever" was released on January 27, 2017, through both Zayn and Swift's official YouTube and Vevo accounts. A behind-the-scenes video was released the same day. The music video was shot at the St Pancras Renaissance London Hotel in London, England. It opens with Zayn walking into the hotel while being surrounded by paparazzi. After getting into his room, he smashes objects like glasses and lamps. Swift is then seen wearing dark lipstick, black lingerie, an unbuttoned jacket, and walking down a dark hallway. She then angrily smashes the mirror and writhes around on bed as close-up shots focus on her makeup and messy hair. Towards the closing moments, there are brief scenes of the two together as lights flash around them.

Exclaim! wrote that the video had a noirish and cinematic quality, while Allure highlighted Swift's persona in the video as her powerful and confident embrace of her sexuality. Billboard summed up the video's narrative as being "fueled by the torture of love". Vulture wrote that the video features Zayn and Swift "sexily [bearing] the weight of their romantic distress" but found Zayn's acting unconvincing and the video overall a little uncomfortable. The video shooting was reported by The Sun to have caused damage and "set fire" to the hotel room.

On February 2 and 3, 2017, Swift and Zayn posted video recordings of them singing their acoustic version "I Don't Wanna Live Forever". Swift's video, tweeted by AT&T, shows her playing the guitar and singing the track for one minute, recorded during a break from her rehearsals for DirecTV's upcoming concert. Zayn's black-and-white video shows him singing the full song in a dimly-lit studio over a backdrop of sparse acoustic guitar.

== Live performances ==
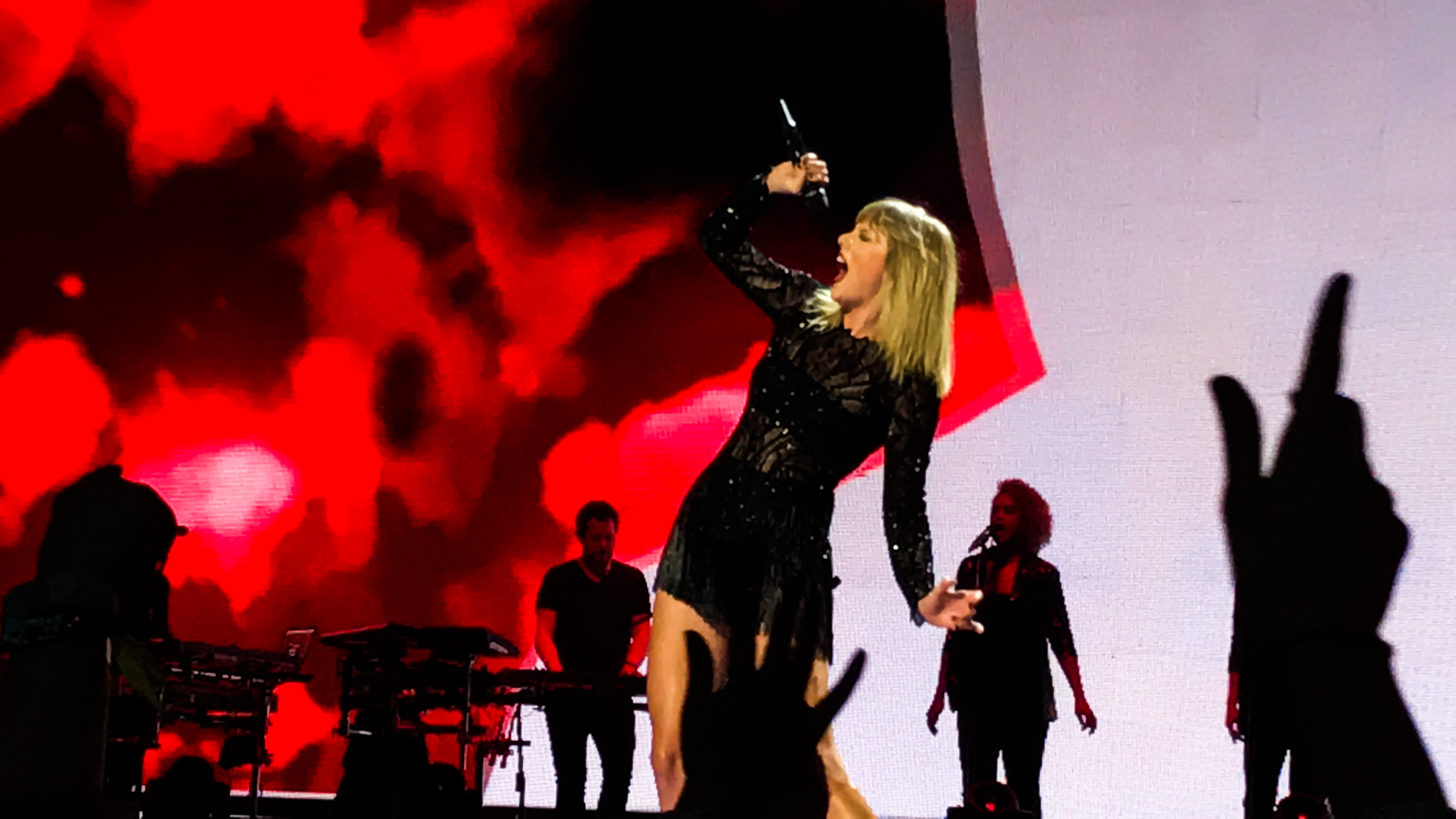
Swift performed "I Don't Wanna Live Forever" solo at the 2017 concert "Super Saturday Night".

Swift performed "I Don't Wanna Live Forever" live several times in 2017. She first performed an acoustic version of it during DirecTV's pre-Super Bowl "Super Saturday Night" event in Houston, Texas, on February 4. In December, she sang "I Don't Wanna Live Forever" at KIIS FM's Jingle Ball in Inglewood, California, on December 1, at B96 Chicago and Pepsi Jingle Bash 2017 in Chicago, Illinois, on December 7, at iHeartRadio Jingle Ball Tour 2017: Z100 Jingle Ball in New York City on December 8, and at Capital FM's Jingle Bell Ball in London, England, on December 10.

On her Reputation Stadium Tour, Swift sang "I Don't Wanna Live Forever" as a "surprise song" at the June 9, 2018, concert in Manchester, England. She sang it again at the Eras Tour as a "surprise song" at four shows: on piano at the June 3, 2023, show in Chicago; as part of a piano mashup with "Dress" (2017) at the March 2, 2024, show in Singapore, which was live streamed via Swift's Instagram account; as part of an acoustic guitar mashup with "Imgonnagetyouback" (2024) at the July 28, 2024, show in Munich, Germany; and as part of an acoustic guitar mashup with "Mine" (2010) at the November 15, 2024, show in Toronto, Canada.

== Accolades ==
At the 60th Annual Grammy Awards in 2018, "I Don't Wanna Live Forever" was nominated for Best Song Written for Visual Media, losing to "How Far I'll Go" for Moana. When it came to the award for best collaboration, it was nominated for those by kid-friendly ceremonies from Radio Disney and Teen Choice, and won those from MTV's Video Music Awards and Millennial Awards. Although Universal Pictures ran a campaign to push the song as an Academy Award contender, it ultimately was not shortlisted, leading Variety to describe it as a "snub". However, it was nominated for the Best Original Song honor from the Satellite Awards. In 2018, iHeartRadio gave the song the Titanium Award, an honor for songs that surpass 1 billion US radio impressions. It was also one of several "Award-Winning Songs" at the 2018 BMI Pop Awards.

== Credits and personnel ==
Credits adapted from the liner notes of Fifty Shades Darker: Original Motion Picture Soundtrack

Recording

- Recorded at Rough Customer Studio (Brooklyn, New York)
- Zayn's vocals recorded at Record Plant (Los Angeles, California)
- Taylor Swift's vocals recorded at Rough Costumer Studios (Brooklyn, New York)
- Additional vocals engineered at NightBird Recording Studios (West Hollywood, California)
- Mixed at MixStar Studios (Virginia Beach, Virginia)
- Mastered at Sterling Sound Studios (New York City, New York)

Management

- Published by Sony/ATV Tree Publishing/Taylor Swift Music (BMI), Sony/ATV Songs LLC/Ducky Donathan Music (BMI), Sony/ATV Sonata/By the Chi Publishing (SESAC), UPG Music Publishing (BMI) and 1320 Music Publishing (SESAC)
- Zayn appears courtesy of RCA Records
- Taylor Swift appears courtesy of Big Machine Records

Personnel

- Zayn – lead vocals
- Taylor Swift – lead vocals, songwriter
- Jack Antonoff – producer, songwriter, instruments, vocals recording (Taylor Swift)
- Sam Dew – background vocals, songwriter
- Daniel Zaidenstadt – vocals recording (Zayn)
- Saltwives – additional vocals engineer
- Şerban Ghenea – mixing
- Tom Coyne – mastering

== Charts ==
=== Weekly charts ===
Weekly chart performance for "I Don't Wanna Live Forever"
Chart (2016–2017)	Peak position
Argentina Airplay (Monitor Latino)	19
Australia (ARIA)	3
Austria (Ö3 Austria Top 40)	2
Belgium (Ultratop 50 Flanders)	7
Belgium (Ultratop 50 Wallonia)	2
Bulgaria Airplay (PROPHON)	4
Canada Hot 100 (Billboard)	2
Canada AC (Billboard)	24
Canada CHR/Top 40 (Billboard)	2
Canada Hot AC (Billboard)	2
CIS Airplay (TopHit)	20
Colombia Streaming (Promúsica)	20
Colombia Airplay (National-Report)	58
Czech Republic Airplay (ČNS IFPI)	15
Czech Republic Singles Digital (ČNS IFPI)	2
Denmark (Tracklisten)	2
Ecuador Airplay (National-Report)	44
Euro Digital Song Sales (Billboard)	3
Finland (Suomen virallinen lista)	7
Finland Airplay (Radiosoittolista)	2
France (SNEP)	4
Germany (GfK)	2
Greece International (IFPI)	2
Hungary (Rádiós Top 40)	21
Hungary (Single Top 40)	3
Iceland (RÚV)	17
Ireland (IRMA)	4
Israel International Airplay (Media Forest)	6
Italy (FIMI)	5
Lebanon (Lebanese Top 20)	3
Luxembourg Digital Song Sales (Billboard)	2
Malaysia (RIM)	2
Mexico Ingles Airplay (Billboard)	32
Netherlands (Dutch Top 40)	7
Netherlands (Single Top 100)	6
New Zealand (Recorded Music NZ)	4
Norway (VG-lista)	2
Poland Airplay (ZPAV)	14
Portugal (AFP)	2
Portugal Digital Song Sales (Billboard)	3
Romania Airplay (Media Forest)	6
Russia Airplay (TopHit)	65
Scottish Singles Sales (Official Charts)	4
Slovakia Singles Digital (ČNS IFPI)	2
Slovenia Airplay (SloTop50)	15
South Korea International (Gaon)	20
Spain (Promusicae)	7
Sweden (Sverigetopplistan)	1
Switzerland (Schweizer Hitparade)	2
UK Singles (Official Charts)	5
US Billboard Hot 100	2
US Adult Contemporary (Billboard)	16
US Adult Pop Airplay (Billboard)	2
US Dance Club Songs (Billboard)	33
US Dance Airplay (Billboard)	3
US Pop Airplay (Billboard)	2
US Rhythmic Airplay (Billboard)	20

=== Year-end charts ===
Year-end chart performance for "I Don't Wanna Live You Forever"
Chart (2017)	Position
Australia (ARIA)	17
Austria (Ö3 Austria Top 40)	24
Belgium (Ultratop Flanders)	47
Belgium (Ultratop Wallonia)	22
Brazil (Pro-Música Brasil)	63
Canada (Canadian Hot 100)	24
Denmark (Tracklisten)	16
France (SNEP)	35
Germany (Official German Charts)	32
Guatemala Airplay (Monitor Latino)	73
Hungary (Single Top 40)	53
Hungary (Stream Top 40)	25
Iceland (Tónlistinn)	17
Israel International Airplay (Media Forest)	50
Italy (FIMI)	30
Latvia Airplay (LaIPA)	13
Netherlands (Dutch Top 40)	49
Netherlands (Single Top 100)	45
New Zealand (Recorded Music NZ)	18
Norway (VG-lista)	17
Poland Airplay (ZPAV)	93
Portugal (AFP)	8
Russia Airplay (Tophit)	90
Spain (Promusicae)	51
Sweden (Sverigetopplistan)	21
Switzerland (Schweizer Hitparade)	16
UK Singles (Official Charts Company)	52
US Billboard Hot 100	26
US Adult Contemporary (Billboard)	39
US Adult Top 40 (Billboard)	13
US Dance/Mix Show Airplay (Billboard)	19
US Mainstream Top 40 (Billboard)	9

== Certifications ==
Certifications for "I Don't Wanna Live Forever"
Region	Certification	Certified units/sales
Australia (ARIA)	10× Platinum	700,000^{‡}
Belgium (BRMA)	Platinum	20,000^{‡}
Brazil (Pro-Música Brasil)	2× Diamond	500,000^{‡}
Canada (Music Canada)	7× Platinum	560,000^{‡}
Denmark (IFPI Danmark)	3× Platinum	270,000^{‡}
France (SNEP)	Diamond	233,333^{‡}
Germany (BVMI)	3× Gold	600,000^{‡}
Italy (FIMI)	3× Platinum	150,000^{‡}
Mexico (AMPROFON)	Platinum+Gold	90,000^{‡}
New Zealand (RMNZ)	5× Platinum	150,000^{‡}
Norway (IFPI Norway)	4× Platinum	240,000^{‡}
Poland (ZPAV)	Diamond	250,000^{‡}
Portugal (AFP)	Platinum	10,000^{‡}
Spain (Promusicae)	2× Platinum	120,000^{‡}
United Kingdom (BPI)	2× Platinum	1,200,000^{‡}
United States (RIAA)	4× Platinum	4,000,000^{‡}
Streaming
Sweden (GLF)	2× Platinum	24,000,000^{†}
^{‡} Sales+streaming figures based on certification alone.^{†} Streaming-only figures based on certification alone.

== Release history ==
Release dates and formats for "I Don't Wanna Live Forever"
Region	Date	Format(s)	Label(s)	Ref.
Various	December 9, 2016	Digital download; streaming	Universal	
United States	December 12, 2016	Hot adult contemporary radio; modern adult contemporary radio	Big Machine; Republic	
United States	December 13, 2016	Contemporary hit radio	Big Machine; Republic	
Italy	January 13, 2017	Radio airplay	Sony; Universal	

== See also ==
- List of number-one digital songs of 2017 (U.S.)
- List of Billboard Hot 100 top 10 singles in 2017
- Billboard Year-End Hot 100 singles of 2017
- List of number-one singles of the 2010s (Sweden)
- List of UK top 10 singles in 2017
- List of top 25 singles for 2017 in Australia
- List of top 10 singles in 2017 (Australia)
