= New Rules =

2017 single by Dua Lipa

Single by Dua Lipa

from the album Dua Lipa
- Released: 7 July 2017
- Recorded: 2016–2017
- Studio: TaP / Strongroom 7 (London); Zenseven (Woodland Hills); NRG (North Hollywood); Atlantic (Los Angeles)
- Genre: Electropop; tropical house
- Length: 3:29
- Label: Warner Bros.
- Songwriters: Caroline Ailin; Emily Warren; Ian Kirkpatrick
- Producer: Ian Kirkpatrick

Dua Lipa singles chronology
"Lost in Your Light" (2017)	"New Rules" (2017)	"IDGAF" (2018)

Music video
- "New Rules" on YouTube

"New Rules" is a song by English singer Dua Lipa from her eponymous debut studio album (2017). The song was written by Caroline Ailin, Emily Warren, and Ian Kirkpatrick. Kirkpatrick also handled the production and offered it to Lipa after it was rejected by multiple artists. The song was released through Warner Bros. Records for digital download and streaming on 7 July 2017 as the album's seventh single. It is an electropop and tropical house track with an EDM production that includes dance-pop beats and dancehall rhythms. The lyrics see Lipa giving herself a set of rules in order to get over a former boyfriend. Lipa stated that it was the breakup song that she wished she had when she was breaking up with someone.

"New Rules" was met with acclaim from music critics. The song was nominated for British Single of the Year at the 2018 Brit Awards and appeared on year-end lists from publications including Billboard, The Guardian and The New York Times. Commercially, the song became Lipa's first number one single on the UK Singles Chart and reached that position in five other territories. As of March 2021 it is the most streamed song by a British female in the UK and it broke the record for the most weeks on the US Mainstream Top 40 chart. It was the second-most played song of the 2010s decade on the format. Additionally, it became Lipa's first top 10 entry on the US Billboard Hot 100, peaking at number 6. The song is certified multi-platinum in 13 territories, including sextuple platinum in the UK and diamond in Canada, France, and Poland. The song's commercial success has been attributed to the popularity of its music video.

The music video for "New Rules" was directed by Henry Scholfield and takes place at the Confidante Hotel in Miami. It features Lipa staying at a hotel room with her friends, who prevent her from getting back together with her former boyfriend. The video was met with critical acclaim, some of whom commended its themes of female empowerment. It made Lipa the youngest female artist with a video to surpass one billion views on YouTube. The video was nominated for British Music Video of the Year at the 2018 Brit Awards and Best Choreography at the 2018 MTV Video Music Awards. Lipa promoted the song with performances at the 2017 BBC Radio 1 Teen Awards, 2018 Brit Awards and 2018 Billboard Music Awards. Remixes by Alison Wonderland, Kream and SG Lewis were released for further promotion.

== Background ==
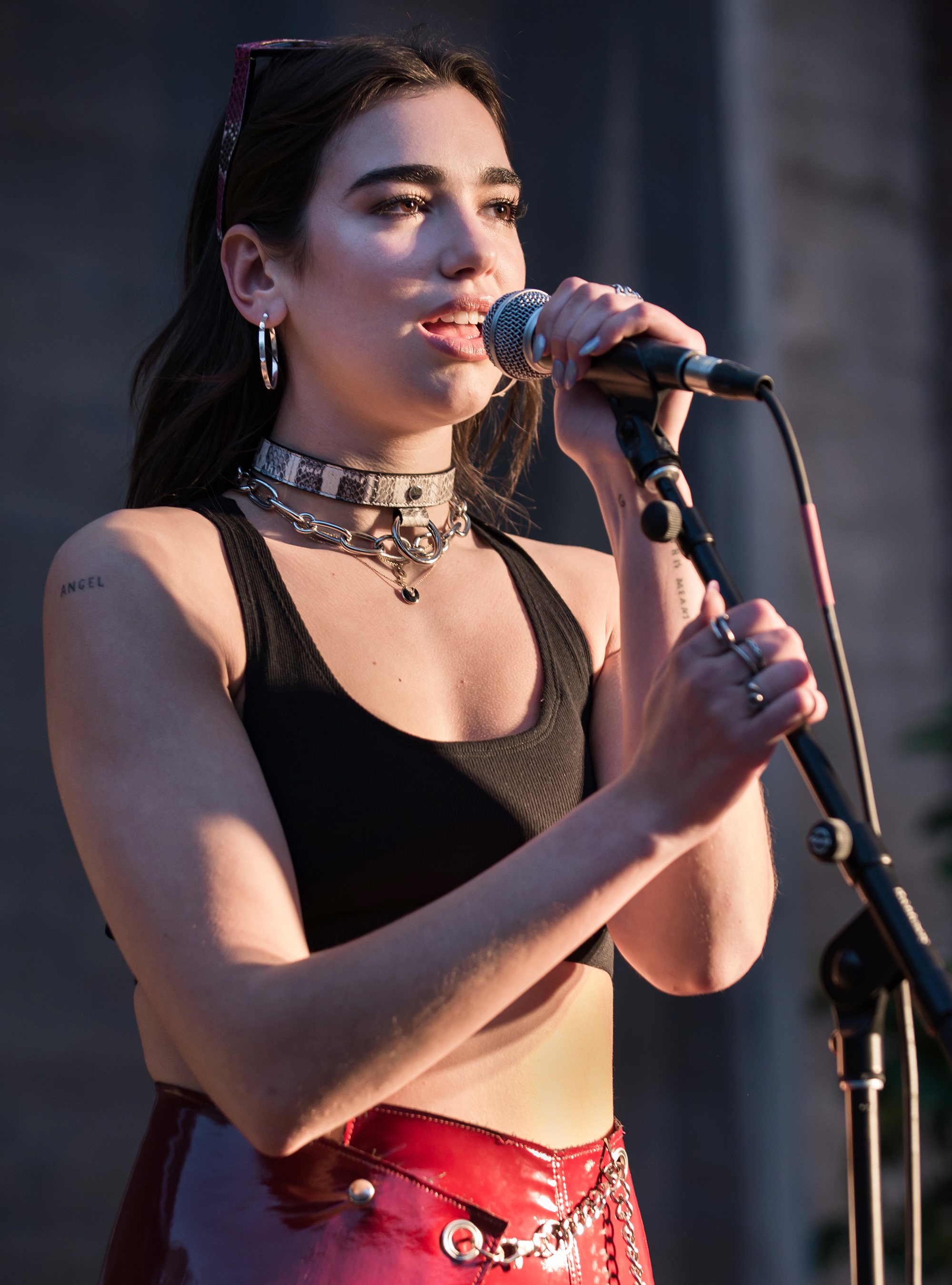
Dua Lipa performing in 2017

"New Rules" was originally written by Caroline Ailin, Emily Warren and its producer Ian Kirkpatrick during a writing camp for English girl band Little Mix. Kirkpatrick also engineered and programmed the track, while Chris Gehringer mastered it and Josh Gudwin mixed it. According to Warren, she was told in the early years of her career to never write a song where the male partner will not "get it", but later stopped following that because she thinks the "best writing" happens when she stops worrying about what to do and just expresses herself. She added that she applied this approach with "New Rules", whose lyrics were inspired by Ailin's struggles with the temptation of getting back together with a former boyfriend. The song was passed down by a few artists, including one who thought it did not have a notable hook.

In January 2017, Dua Lipa announced through her Facebook account that she was postponing the release of her eponymous debut studio album to 2 June of that year in order to record more songs. After this, she traveled to Los Angeles, California, where Kirkpatrick played her "New Rules" and she recorded it. The song was recorded at Zenseven Studios in Woodland Hills, Los Angeles, NRG Studios in North Hollywood, Los Angeles and Atlantic Recording Studios in Los Angeles while the vocals were recorded at TaP Studio / Strongroom 7 in London. Chris Gehringer mastered the song at Sterling Sound in New York City. When asked about the fact that she did not write the song after saying in past interviews that she preferred to write her own music, Lipa stated that her perspective had changed and that:

I still take a lot of pride in being able to write my own songs. My story's coming from me. But 'New Rules' is a song that I felt like I had been in the room and written. I'm so close with Emily [Warren] and Caroline [Ailin] and Ian [Kirkpatrick], who had worked on it, that I feel like it was a song they had written with me in mind. I'm proud of it as if I had been in that room. I just feel so closely to it. I guess I don't have that perspective anymore. But like I said, I still love writing everything. And I'm still going to do it. But it's a song that I feel like I can relate to on a personal level, that I also feel that when I do perform it, it becomes mine and I embody it in a different way.

== Music and lyrics ==
Musically, "New Rules" is an electropop and tropical house song. Constructed in verse-chorus form, the song is composed in 4/4 time and the key of A minor with a tempo of 116 beats per minute and an Am–G–F–G chord progression. Running for 3 minutes and 29 seconds, the EDM production includes a dance-pop beat, a dancehall rhythm, tropical house keyboards and airy drum programming similar to that used in Africa and the Caribbean. The verses include a falling bass glissando, while a synth melody and pattering drums build up to the chorus drop with bashment elements, glitchy horns and string stabs. The synth line appears again in the final chorus. Lipa's vocals range from A_{3} to E_{5} and she adapts a "stern, schoolmarmish" tone. Her vocals echo with a 3/8-note ping-pong vocal-delay spin while high-feedback backing vocals also are heard. To give character to her vocals, Kirkpatrick tracked her at half the speed in some parts and digitally sped them up to twice as fast.

In the lyrics, the singer sets a list of rules to prevent her from getting back together with an ex-boyfriend. The rules are: "One: Don't pick up the phone, you know he's only calling 'cause he's drunk and alone / Two: Don't let him in, you'll have to kick him out again / Three: Don't be his friend, you know you're going to wake up in his bed in the morning." Lipa confessed that "[t]hey're not necessarily rules I've been able to stick by. But [they're] rules that I feel like it's important to be able to tell yourself, to tell your friends... There's a reason people break up, and it's probably the same reason why you shouldn't get back together." Warren explained that the track was a self-reminder for people recovering from a break-up to not succumb to a momentary temptation since it is not "a good idea in the long term". Talking about the song, Lipa explained that "'New Rules' is quite different to a lot of tracks on the album. I wanted it to feel very new [...] It's the breakup song that I wish I had when I was breaking up with someone" and that "It's about keeping your distance from someone who's bad for you. I'm setting some rules down so [that I] won't go back to that person."

== Release ==
"New Rules" was released on 2 June 2017 as the tenth track on Lipa's eponymous debut studio album; it appears as the 13th track on the album's Austrian, German and Swiss version. The song was released for digital download and streaming through Warner Bros. Records on 7 July 2017 as the album's seventh single. It was sent for radio airplay in Italy on 28 July 2017. In the United States, the song impacted adult contemporary radio on 21 August 2017 and contemporary hit radio the following day.

A remix of "New Rules" by Alison Wonderland was released on 25 August of that year. An acoustic version of the song was released 20 October. An extended play (EP) featuring remixes by Kream, Freedo, SG Lewis, MRK titled "Club Mix" as well as the one by Wonderland was released 3 November. On 17 November, "New Rules" was released as a CD single in Germany, with its acoustic version as its B-side. A week later, a 1980s and vaporwave-styled, Hi-NRG remix by Initial Talk was released. The DJ was inspired by "Two of Hearts" (1986) by Stacey Q and included heavy synths with SFX drums. It was accompanied by a visual featuring a fuzzy VCR footage of an old Miss Teen Canada pageant. The remix appears Japanese special edition of Dua Lipa and the Japanese edition of the album's 2018 reissue, Dua Lipa: Complete Edition.

A live piano acoustic version of "New Rules" appears as the closing track on the singer's Live Acoustic EP, released 8 December of that year. The following year, another live version of Lipa's performance at the 2018 Brit Awards was released on 21 February. An official live version of the song that was recorded at the 29 June 2018 stop of Lipa's world tour in San Diego was released on 6 September of that year; it appears as the closing track of Dua Lipa: Complete Edition. Lipa's performance of the song on BBC Radio 1's Live Lounge was included on their 23 November 2018-released compilation album, BBC Radio 1's Live Lounge 2018 as the third track. A different live version of the song appears as the second track on Lipa's Deezer Sessions EP, released 11 April 2019.

== Critical reception ==
"New Rules" received acclaim from music critics. AllMusic's Neil Z. Yeung complimented the song on its "house-inflected shine" in which Lipa makes "a cautionary list". Writing for Clash, Alex Green felt tracks like "New Rules" demonstrate "exactly why critics picked Lipa out as one to watch [the previous year]." Dayna Evans of The Cut labeled it a "breakup anthem", while Melinda Newman of Billboard considered it a "female-empowerment anthem". Anjali Raguraman of The Straits Times also called the song a "breakup anthem" and an "addictive, horn-laced pop tune", adding that, "The track, with its slick production and stellar vocals, oozes self-confidence and sass." Ben Hogwood of musicOMH stated that the song had themes of "assertiveness and outright feminine power" and that it felt more convincing than "Blow Your Mind (Mwah)" (2016). Rachael Scarsbrook of Renowned for Sound opined that the song makes "sure the upbeat melodies continue long into the final moments of Lipa's record, the album may almost be over but the party is just beginning."

Larisha Paul of Baeble Music deemed it as an "absolute banger" and a "timeless song". On his review of the album, Sebas E. Alonso of Spanish website Jenesaispop noted that "New Rules" had influences of the music of the 1990s. Alonso further included the track on his list of the best songs of August 2017, calling it a "summer hit". Hannah J Davies of The Guardian stated that it was "infused with EDM and tropical house without sounding too consciously trend-chasing", while Luke Holland of the same publication called it the track of the week and praised the lyrical content, though he further stated that "disposable pop is now actually this good". In another review from the publication, Ben Beaumont-Thomas named the song a "powerful pop psychodrama". Raisa Bruner of Time wrote that "'New Rules' works so well because it's both stylish and layered: As an escapist fantasy of girl-power, it's a triumph, but as a rallying cry to buck the status quo, it's even better." In a more negative review, DIY's Alim Kheraj stated that the song "is a flat tropically-tinged empowerment track that already sounds dated."

== Accolades ==
"New Rules" appeared on 2017 year-end lists by numerous publications, including unranked lists from Esquire, The Guardian, Junkee and The New York Times. Time hailed it as 2017's best song. It additionally ranked within the top 10 of year-end lists by Popjustice at number 5 and The Line of Best Fit at number 8. In NME and Entertainment Weekly, the song ranked at number 13 and 29 on their year-end lists. Stereogum placed it at number 38 on their year-end list, while Noisey thought it was 2017's 34th best song. The Fader named it the 82nd best song and Spin ranked it at number 97. Billboard ranked it at number four on the list of the best gay anthems of 2017 while the song placed at number 22 on their general list. Rob Sheffield of Rolling Stone ranked it at number 19 on his year-end list. "New Rules" also placed on 2010s decade-end lists from NME (21), Insider (106) and Stereogum (114). In June 2020, The Guardian ranked the song as the 94th best UK number one single.

"New Rules" has received several awards and nominations. At the 2018 Brit Awards, the song was nominated for British Single of the Year. It won best single at the BBC Radio 1 Teen Awards in 2017. It was a winning song at the 2019 BMI Pop Awards. It won International Song of the Year at the LOS40 Music Awards 2018 and Best Song To Lip Sync To at the 2018 Radio Disney Music Awards. The song additionally received nominations for Pop Song of the Year at the 2017 The Beano Awards, International Song of the Year at the 2018 Gaygalan Awards, Global Hit of the Year at the 2018 MTV Millennial Awards, Song of the Year at the 2018 MTV Video Music Awards, Best Track at the 2018 NME Awards and Choice Song: Female Artist at the 2018 Teen Choice Awards.

== Commercial performance ==
The track's commercial success has been attributed to the popularity of its music video. In the United Kingdom, "New Rules" debuted at number 75 on the UK Singles Chart issue dated 14 July 2017. In its fourth week, the song reached number nine, becoming her third top ten single on the chart following "No Lie" and "Be the One" earlier that year. Two weeks later, it rose to number one, becoming Lipa's first chart-topping single in the country. In doing so, it also became the first song in almost two years by a female solo artist to reach the top, since "Hello" by Adele in 2015. It remained at number one the following week, and spent a total of 66 weeks on the chart. In 2026, the song was certified sextuple platinum from the British Phonographic Industry (BPI) for track-equivalent sales of 3,600,000 units in the UK. As of March 2021, the song is the most streamed song by a British female artist in the UK with 261.1 million; it lands at number two overall for female artists behind "Dance Monkey" by Tones and I.

"New Rules" reached the summit of charts in Ireland, the Netherlands and the Flanders region of Belgium. In Australia, the song reached number two on the ARIA Singles Chart dated 1 October 2017, after debuting at number 46 eight weeks earlier. After selling 490,000 track-equivalent units, it was awarded a seven times platinum certification from the Australian Recording Industry Association (ARIA). In New Zealand, the song reached number three and was certified 6× platinum by the Recorded Music NZ (RMNZ) for sales of 180,000. In France, the song was awarded a diamond certification from the Syndicat National de l'Édition Phonographique (SNEP) for selling 333,333 track-equivalent units.

In the United States, "New Rules" spent two weeks on the Bubbling Under Hot 100 Singles chart before entering the Billboard Hot 100 at number 90 on the chart dated 19 August 2017, becoming her third entry on the ranking, after "Blow Your Mind (Mwah)" in 2016, and "Scared to Be Lonely" earlier that year. The song later at number six the following February, becoming Lipa's first top 10 hit in the United States and her highest-peaking single on the occasion. It also became Lipa's third number one on the Dance Club Songs chart and topped the Pop Songs chart for four weeks in February 2018. On the Pop Songs chart dated 23 June 2018, it spent its forty-second week, becoming the track with the most weeks on the chart. It was certified five times platinum from the Recording Industry Association of America for 5,000,000 track-equivalent sales in the US. In Canada, "New Rules" reached number seven on the Canadian Singles Chart and was awarded a diamind certification by Music Canada (MC) for selling 800,000 track-equivalent units.

== Music video ==
=== Background ===
[I wanted to] show [in the music video for "New Rules"] that you and your friends are kind of helping each other. Your friends are the rules, they are the ones that are preventing you from making a mistake with this guy.

— Lipa talking about the music video's themes.

The music video for "New Rules" was directed by Henry Scholfield, who also shot Lipa's previous visual, "Lost in Your Light". The singer invited Scholfield for a cup of tea in London in order to discuss her ideas for the clip. Lipa had saved a picture of model Naomi Campbell holding another woman in her back during a campaign in the 1980s as a "reference point", explaining that, "I loved the idea of girls looking after each other like that, holding each other, that sense of humility, that sense of strength." Lipa also had the idea of including a group of flamingos into the clip, as she considered them a good representation of female friendship. The director contacted Teresa Barcelo to choreograph the dance routine and bring that "narrative of togetherness and empowerment" into it. Barcelo also took inspiration from the flamingos' movements while planning the choreography. More than 200 women auditioned for the video, with eight being selected.

The filming took place in June 2017 at The Confidante, a hotel located in Miami Beach that is part of the Unbound Collection brand by Hyatt. Hyatt's vice president of global brands, Sandra Micek, stated that the collaboration between the artist and the hotel made sense to her because "[The Confidante's] inspiration and its name came from the notion of being a trusted friend". Regarding the shooting, Scholfield commented that the camera was quite near during the dance routines, in order to film more uninterrupted single takes. During an interview with NPR, Lipa commented that, "What I wanted to convey in this video is the unity and togetherness of women supporting each other, helping each other and looking after each other in a situation." The visual premiered through Lipa's YouTube account on 7 July 2017. After this, Hyatt released two behind-the-scenes clips of the shooting.

=== Synopsis ===
Lipa (far left) and her on-screen friends on the music video for "New Rules". The women are holding each other during the sleepover scene. The clip has been praised for its themes of female empowerment and friendship.

The video starts with a shot of the outside view of The Confidante hotel and two flamingos. In the next scene, and in the context of the track, Lipa is lying on a bed, thinking of giving her ex a second chance, while her friends are by her side. As the song continues, the artist heads towards the phone to answer his call, but is stopped by one of her friends. Then, she keeps receiving advice from the women, but manages to escape to the hallway. There, they perform a choreography, and return to the room. In the next scenes, the women start a sleepover, brushing each other's hair and applying lipstick on each other. They change their outfits and head towards the pool, where they walk over the water.

After the song's bridge, one of the women makes plans of reuniting with her former boyfriend, but is stopped by Lipa, who gives her the advice she received at the beginning of the visual. After this, the group perform a choreography in front of the pool, in which they pull "each other in closer, in an unbreakable ring of limbs". This is Lipa and Scholfield's favorite scene, with the latter stating, "That wrapped up the whole story for me. The viewer is on the outside, but that choreography pulls you into them, and makes you a part of that connection, too." The video ends with the women standing in front of the pool, with the camera turning upside-down and then showing a group of flamingos at the same location.

=== Reception ===
After the release of the music video, Lipa debuted on Billboard's Social 50 chart at number 26. In February 2019, the clip surpassed one billion views on YouTube, making Lipa the youngest female artist to accomplish that. The video appeared on 2017 year-end lists by Billboard (8), The Guardian, Pitchfork and V, as well as a 2010s decade-end list by the former of the four publications at number 41. It was nominated for the British Music Video of the Year accolade at the 2018 Brit Awards. At the 2017 UK Music Video Awards, the video won Best Pop Video and was nominated for the Vevo MUST SEE Award. Additionally, it was nominated for Best Music Video at the 2018 iHeartRadio Music Awards, International Video of the Year at the LOS40 Music Awards 2018, Best Choreography at the 2018 MTV Video Music Awards and Best Video at the 2018 NME Awards. The video was a winning video at the MTV Video Play Awards.

The music video for "New Rules" was met with acclaim from critics, many of whom praised its pop visuals and themes of female empowerment. Aliza Abarbanel of Refinery29 commented on the visual, "'New Rules', and all the epic outfits in it, perfectly encapsulates the joy of female friendship—and the joy in getting dressed up together." Paper's Claire Valentine labelled it Lipa's "strongest video so far." Hafeezah Nazim of Nylon called it "a empowering visual", while New Statesman writer Anna Leszkiewicz described it as a "colourful and acutely choreographed video", as well as considering it one of the best clips released in July 2017. Alessia Scappaticci of The Loop praised the visual's themes of self-esteem, diversity and friendship, adding that it "definitely deserves all of the positive attention it's been getting". T.L. Stanley of Adweek noted that in the plot, the women are "standing together, mirroring a current trend in pop culture and entertainment that shows women supporting each other (catfights are so yesterday)." BBC reporter Mark Savage wrote that the video is "unquestionably brilliant" and should have won British Video of the Year at the 2018 Brit Awards. Owen Myers of The Fader praised the female-empowerment themes of the clip, and furthermore commented on its importance on Lipa's career, stating that, "The release of 'New Rules' gave Lipa something else that until then mostly eluded her: credibility. She has often talked in interviews about her feminist beliefs, and taking pride in her involvement with every aspect of her music."

The music video also received positive comments from artists like Lorde, Charli XCX and Tegan and Sara through their respective Twitter accounts. On 12 July 2017, Lipa thanked her fans for the visual's popularity, and recommended them to use the hashtag #DuasNewRules when uploading covers of the track in order to include them on a compilation video. The next day, Filmmaker Jake Wilson uploaded a gay parody of the music video using the hashtag, which drew the attention of some blogs and the artist herself. On 4 August 2017, the singer released the compilation video of covers and parodies of the song and the visual on her YouTube account.

== Live performances ==
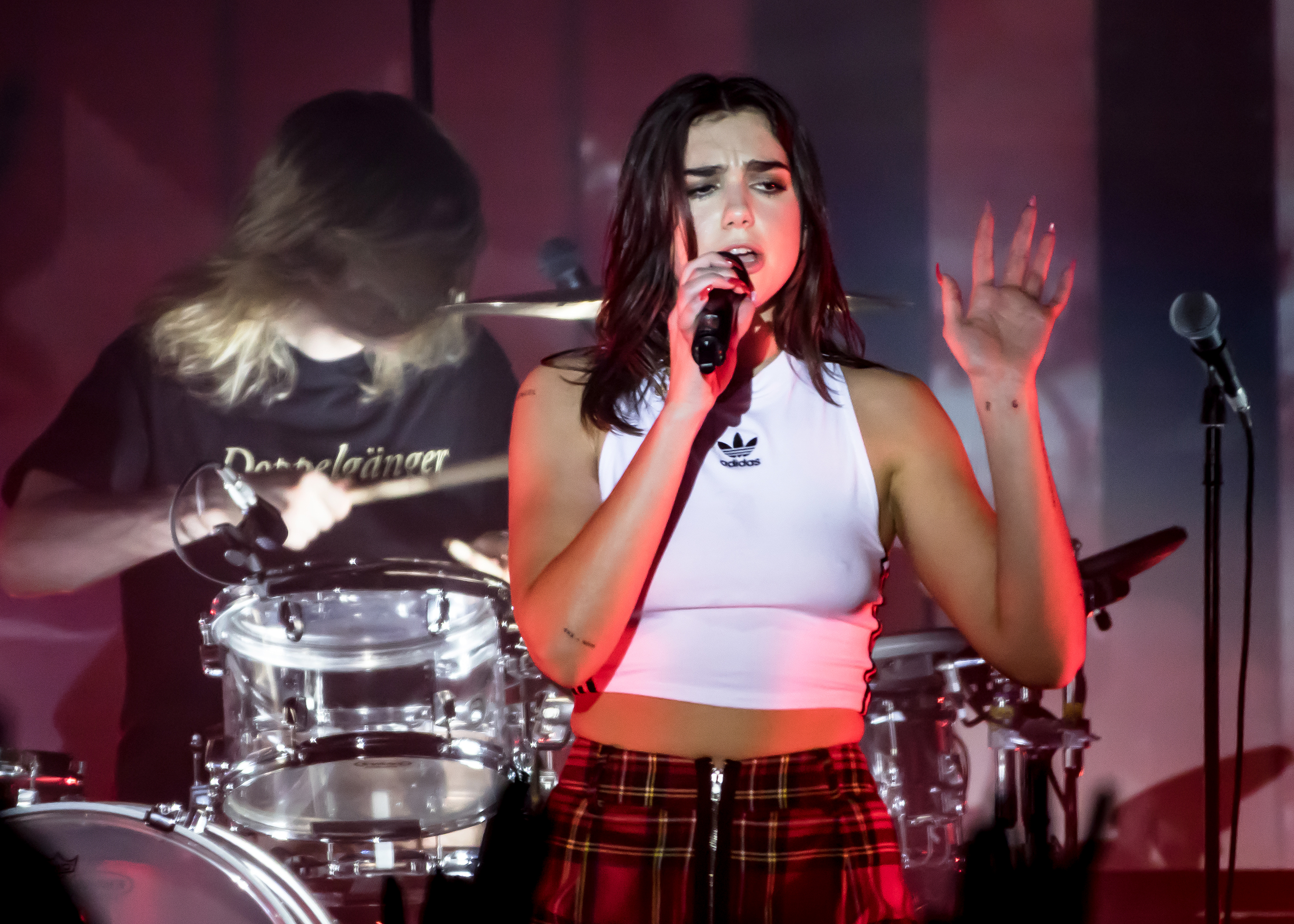
Dua Lipa performing "New Rules" during The Self-Titled Tour in 2018

Lipa performed "New Rules" at the Glastonbury Festival in England on 23 June 2017. On 4 October 2017, the singer performed "New Rules" on The Jonathan Ross Show, where she was accompanied by a group of dancers with whom she recreated the scenes of the music video. Later that month, the artist sang the song during the BBC Radio 1 Teen Awards, where she received the Best Single award for the track, and on Later... with Jools Holland. On 9 December, she performed "New Rules" at the Jingle Bell Ball concert in London. Days later, Lipa appeared on the fifth season of Spanish musical competition La Voz, where she sang the song alongside the finalists. Lipa also performed the track during the encore of The Self-Titled Tour (2017–18).

On 3 February 2018, Lipa sang "New Rules" and "Homesick" on Saturday Night Live. Alex Robert Ross of Noisey reviewed positively the performance, calling it "ultimately professional" and praising Lipa for her vocal rendition. Ten days later, she appeared on The Ellen DeGeneres Show, where she performed "New Rules" accompanied by a group of dancers wearing sleepwear similar to that of the music video. The next day, Lipa sang an acoustic version of the track on BBC Radio 1's Live Lounge segment. On 14 February, the artist performed "New Rules" and "IDGAF" on Jimmy Kimmel Live!. The performance was not aired until 19 March 2018, around the time the singer cancelled two shows in Australia to remove her wisdom teeth. This led journalist Richard Wilkins, thinking the performance occurred on the air date, to accuse the singer of lying on Nine News. Lipa responded through her Twitter account, indicating the difference between the dates and stating that she was still recovering from the surgery in Australia. Although Wilkins apologised, the artist later told KIIS-FM that she have found his comments "dangerous" and "really upsetting".

Lipa performed "New Rules" during the 2018 Brit Awards on a summer-styled stage, moments after winning the British Female Solo Artist accolade. Billboard's Rachel George deemed the performance as "girl-power inspired". Lipa's appearance helped her eponymous debut studio album, which had previously peaked at number five, to reach number three on the UK Albums Chart. On 20 May 2018, the artist performed "New Rules" at the 2018 Billboard Music Awards. Six days later, Lipa sang the track as part of a medley of her most successful songs during the opening ceremony of the 2018 UEFA Champions League Final in Kyiv, Ukraine. The song was later included on the setlist of Lipa's 2022 Future Nostalgia Tour.

== Track listings ==
- Digital download and streaming
1. "New Rules" – 3:29
- Digital download and streaming – Alison Wonderland remix
1. "New Rules" (Alison Wonderland remix) – 4:23
- Digital download and streaming – acoustic version
1. "New Rules" (acoustic) – 3:33
- Digital EP – remixes
1. "New Rules" (Kream remix) – 4:40
2. "New Rules" (Freedo remix) – 3:33
3. "New Rules" (SG Lewis remix) – 4:13
4. "New Rules" (MRK club mix) – 4:44
5. "New Rules" (Alison Wonderland remix) – 4:23

- CD single
1. "New Rules" – 3:29
2. "New Rules" (acoustic) – 3:33
- Digital download and streaming – Initial Talk remix
1. "New Rules" (Initial Talk remix) – 3:44
- Digital download and streaming – live at the BRITs
1. "New Rules" (live at the BRITs) – 3:37
- Digital download and streaming – live version
1. "New Rules" (live) – 3:44

== Personnel ==
- Dua Lipa – vocals, background vocals
- Ian Kirkpatrick – production, vocal production, engineering, programming
- Josh Gudwin – mixing
- Chris Gehringer – mastering

== Charts ==
=== Weekly charts ===
Weekly chart positions for "New Rules"
Chart (2017–2021)	Peak position
Argentina Anglo Airplay (Monitor Latino)	9
Australia (ARIA)	2
Austria (Ö3 Austria Top 40)	11
Belarus Airplay (Eurofest)	5
Belgium (Ultratop 50 Flanders)	1
Belgium (Ultratop 50 Wallonia)	4
Bolivia Airplay (Monitor Latino)	7
Brazil Airplay (Brasil Hot 100)	6
Brazil Streaming (Pro-Música)	3
Canada Hot 100 (Billboard)	7
Canada AC (Billboard)	38
Canada CHR/Top 40 (Billboard)	4
Canada Hot AC (Billboard)	17
Colombia Airplay (National-Report)	6
Costa Rica Airplay (Monitor Latino)	18
Croatia International Airplay (Top lista)	2
CIS Airplay (TopHit)	4
Czech Republic Airplay (ČNS IFPI)	31
Czech Republic Singles Digital (ČNS IFPI)	6
Denmark (Tracklisten)	14
Ecuador Airplay (National-Report)	38
El Salvador Airplay (Monitor Latino)	16
Euro Digital Song Sales (Billboard)	3
Finland (Suomen virallinen lista)	5
France (SNEP)	32
Germany (GfK)	9
Global Excl. U.S. (Billboard) (Note: The Billboard Global Excl. U.S. chart was launched in September 2020. Therefore, "New Rules" did not have a full run on the chart.)	191
Greece International (IFPI Greece)	3
Hungary (Rádiós Top 40)	1
Hungary (Single Top 40)	8
Hungary (Stream Top 40)	2
Hungary (Dance Top 40)	12
Iceland (Tónlistinn)	7
Ireland (IRMA)	1
Israel International Airplay (Media Forest)	1
Italy (FIMI)	8
Japan Hot Overseas (Billboard)	20
Latvia Streaming (DigiTop100)	8
Malaysia (RIM)	3
Mexico Airplay (Billboard)	18
Mexico Streaming (AMPROFON)	16
Netherlands (Dutch Top 40)	1
Netherlands (Mega Top 50)	9
Netherlands (Single Top 100)	1
New Zealand (Recorded Music NZ)	3
Norway (VG-lista)	5
Panama Anglo Airplay (Monitor Latino)	3
Peru Airplay (Monitor Latino)	17
Philippines (Philippine Hot 100)	6
Poland Airplay (ZPAV)	5
Portugal (AFP)	3
Romania (Airplay 100)	1
Romania Airplay (Media Forest)	1
Romania TV Airplay (Media Forest)	1
Russia Airplay (TopHit)	6
Scottish Singles Sales (Official Charts)	2
Singapore (RIAS)	10
Slovakia Airplay (ČNS IFPI)	42
Slovakia Singles Digital (ČNS IFPI)	6
Slovenia Airplay (SloTop50)	8
South Korea International (Gaon)	20
Spain (Promusicae)	12
Sweden (Sverigetopplistan)	7
Switzerland (Schweizer Hitparade)	11
UK Singles (Official Charts)	1
Ukraine Airplay (Tophit)	100
Uruguay Airplay (Monitor Latino)	15
US Billboard Hot 100	6
US Adult Contemporary (Billboard)	18
US Adult Pop Airplay (Billboard)	7
US Dance Club Songs (Billboard)	1
US Dance Airplay (Billboard)	1
US Latin Pop Airplay (Billboard)	40
US Pop Airplay (Billboard)	1
US Rhythmic Airplay (Billboard)	4
Venezuela (National-Report)	77

2025 weekly chart performance for "New Rules"
Chart (2025)	Peak position
Romania Airplay (TopHit)	99

=== Year-end charts ===
2017 year-end chart positions for "New Rules"
Chart (2017)	Position
Australia (ARIA)	22
Austria (Ö3 Austria Top 40)	52
Belgium (Ultratop Flanders)	17
Belgium (Ultratop Wallonia)	67
Brazil (Pro-Música Brasil)	39
Canada (Canadian Hot 100)	64
CIS (Tophit)	73
Denmark (Tracklisten)	58
France (SNEP)	151
Germany (Official German Charts)	41
Hungary (Dance Top 40)	55
Hungary (Rádiós Top 40)	41
Hungary (Single Top 40)	37
Hungary (Stream Top 40)	9
Israel (Media Forest)	14
Italy (FIMI)	62
Latvia Airplay (LaIPA)	81
Netherlands (Dutch Top 40)	11
Netherlands (Single Top 100)	18
New Zealand (Recorded Music NZ)	15
Norway (VG-lista)	34
Poland (ZPAV)	83
Portugal (AFP)	19
Romania (Airplay 100)	25
Russia Airplay (Tophit)	88
Spain (PROMUSICAE)	59
Sweden (Sverigetopplistan)	39
Switzerland (Schweizer Hitparade)	61
UK Singles (OCC)	11
US Dance Club Songs (Billboard)	9

2018 year-end chart positions for "New Rules"
Chart (2018)	Position
Argentina (Monitor Latino)	98
Australia (ARIA)	54
Belgium (Ultratop Flanders)	43
Canada (Canadian Hot 100)	17
Denmark (Tracklisten)	79
France (SNEP)	130
Germany (Official German Charts)	100
Hungary (Dance Top 40)	15
Hungary (Rádiós Top 40)	87
Hungary (Single Top 40)	65
Hungary (Stream Top 40)	18
Iceland (Plötutíóindi)	30
Ireland (IRMA)	28
Netherlands (Dutch Top 40)	192
Netherlands (Single Top 100)	91
New Zealand (Recorded Music NZ)	40
Portugal (AFP)	32
Romania (Airplay 100)	53
Spain (PROMUSICAE)	76
Sweden (Sverigetopplistan)	63
Switzerland (Schweizer Hitparade)	92
UK Singles (OCC)	20
US Billboard Hot 100	16
US Radio Songs (Billboard)	6
US Adult Contemporary (Billboard)	44
US Adult Top 40 (Billboard)	31
US Dance/Mix Show Airplay (Billboard)	4
US Mainstream Top 40 (Billboard)	1
US Rhythmic (Billboard)	37

2025 year-end chart positions for "New Rules"
Chart (2025)	Position
Hungary (Rádiós Top 40)	62

=== Decade-end charts ===
2010s decade-end chart positions for "New Rules"
Chart (2010–2019)	Position
UK Singles (OCC)	27
US Mainstream Top 40 (Billboard)	2

== Certifications ==
Certifications and sales for "New Rules"
Region	Certification	Certified units/sales
Australia (ARIA)	7× Platinum	490,000^{‡}
Austria (IFPI Austria)	2× Platinum	60,000^{‡}
Belgium (BRMA)	2× Platinum	40,000^{‡}
Canada (Music Canada)	Diamond	800,000^{‡}
Denmark (IFPI Danmark)	2× Platinum	180,000^{‡}
France (SNEP)	Diamond	333,333^{‡}
Germany (BVMI)	2× Platinum	800,000^{‡}
Ireland	—	100,000 (Note: Ireland sales figures for "New Rules" as of November 2018)
Italy (FIMI)	3× Platinum	150,000^{‡}
New Zealand (RMNZ)	7× Platinum	210,000^{‡}
Norway (IFPI Norway)	3× Platinum	180,000^{‡}
Poland (ZPAV)	Diamond	250,000^{‡}
Portugal (AFP)	4× Platinum	40,000^{‡}
Spain (Promusicae)	4× Platinum	240,000^{‡}
United Kingdom (BPI)	6× Platinum	3,600,000^{‡}
United States (RIAA)	5× Platinum	5,000,000^{‡}
Streaming
Sweden (GLF)	4× Platinum	32,000,000^{†}
Japan (RIAJ)	Gold	50,000,000^{†}
^{‡} Sales+streaming figures based on certification alone.^{†} Streaming-only figures based on certification alone.

== Release history ==
Release dates and formats for "New Rules"
Region	Date	Format	Version	Label	Ref.
Various	7 July 2017	Digital download; streaming	Original	Warner Bros.	
Italy	28 July 2017	Radio airplay	Original	Warner Bros.	
United States	21 August 2017	Adult contemporary radio	Original	Warner Bros.	
United States	22 August 2017	Contemporary hit radio	Original	Warner Bros.	
Various	25 August 2017	Digital download; streaming	Alison Wonderland remix	Warner Bros.	
Various	20 October 2017	Digital download; streaming	Acoustic	Warner Bros.	
Various	3 November 2017	Digital download; streaming	Remixes EP	Warner Bros.	
DACH	17 November 2017	CD single	Original / acoustic	Warner Bros.	
Various	24 November 2017	Digital download; streaming	Initial Talk remix	Warner Bros.	
Various	21 February 2018	Digital download; streaming	Live at the BRITs	Warner Bros.	
Various	6 September 2018	Digital download; streaming	Live	Warner Bros.	

== See also ==
- List of Live Lounge cover versions
- List of UK Singles Chart number ones of the 2010s
- List of number-one singles of the 2010s (Hungary)
- List of million-selling singles in the United Kingdom
- List of songs which have spent the most weeks on the UK Singles Chart
- List of most-viewed YouTube videos
- List of Australian chart achievements and milestones
- List of Platinum singles in the United Kingdom awarded since 2000
- List of most-streamed songs on Spotify
- List of Billboard Dance Club Songs number ones of 2017
- List of Dutch Top 40 number-one singles of 2017
- List of number-one singles of 2017 (Ireland)
- List of UK top-ten singles in 2017
- List of Ultratop 50 number-one singles of 2017
- List of top 10 singles in 2017 (Australia)
- List of Billboard Mainstream Top 40 number-one songs of 2018
- List of number-one dance airplay hits of 2018 (U.S.)
- List of top 25 singles for 2017 in Australia
- List of Airplay 100 number ones of the 2010s
- List of UK Singles Sales Chart number ones
- List of Media Forest most-broadcast songs of the 2010s in Romania
