= Liar Liar GE2017 =

Single by Captain SKA
- Released: 26 May 2017
- Recorded: 2017
- Genre: Ska
- Length: 3:16
- Label: Captain's Records
- Songwriter: Jake Painter
- Producer: Captain SKA

Captain SKA singles chronology
"Pieces of Me" (2017)	"Liar Liar GE2017" (2017)

"Liar Liar GE2017" is a protest song performed by the British ska/reggae band Captain SKA. Released on 26 May 2017 by Captain's Records in association with the People's Assembly Against Austerity, and in anticipation of the 2017 general election, the song is critical of Prime Minister Theresa May, remarking upon her cuts to various government agencies and programmes, as well as her political positions. The song is a remake of a previous version of the song, "Liar Liar", which was released in 2010, and similarly critical of the previous coalition government led by David Cameron.

By 31 May 2017, "Liar Liar GE17" had become the most-purchased song in the United Kingdom on Amazon Music and iTunes Store, and on 2 June 2017 it charted at #4 on the UK Singles Chart. Proceeds from sales of the single until 8 June 2017 (the day of the election) were to be donated to support food banks and the People's Assembly.

Despite the strong media attention and sales that the song achieved, it had done so without radio airplay; due to concerns that it could run afoul of broadcasting regulations requiring impartiality in coverage of elections during the campaign period, British radio stations refused to play "Liar Liar GE17". The band was particularly critical of BBC Radio's attempts to suppress the song on both radio and their associated digital platforms, as they felt that the broadcaster was attempting to inhibit "critical thinking or debate" rather than act in the public interest.

== Composition and release ==
The song accuses then current British Conservative politician and Prime Minister Theresa May of being a liar who cannot be trusted, and its lyric video highlights the plight of nurses working for the National Health Service (NHS) having to resort to using food banks; and cuts to education, the NHS, social care, policing, and welfare benefits such as Disability Living Allowance, under the Conservatives' rule. The video also points out May's political U-turns on Brexit, the so-called "dementia tax", and calling a snap election. The song also warns against populism, and the danger of placing control of the Mother of All Bombs (MOAB) and nuclear weapons in the hands of U.S. president Donald Trump.

"Liar Liar GE2017" is an updated version of "Liar Liar", a song released in 2010 at the time of protests against a rise in college tuition fees. It had attacked the coalition government of the time, led by Conservative Prime Minister David Cameron and Liberal Democrat and Deputy Prime Minister Nick Clegg. The new version was released in the run-up to the 2017 general election, with an accompanying video that features music and vocals mixed with selected speeches and interviews by May.

Band member Jake Painter explained that "the 2010 release has kind of been around for a while and I ended up getting so many messages to remix it I thought I’d do it." He went on to explain that "original music, and especially political music, doesn't have traction any more. Everyone is totally over the moon with it." The group aimed for "Liar Liar GE2017" to reach the top 40 of the UK Singles Chart, so that pop music stations would be "forced" to give it airtime — as they would with any other song — thus helping to raise awareness of the song's anti-austerity message. All proceeds from the song between 26 May and 8 June 2017 (election day) are to be shared between food banks around the UK and the People's Assembly Against Austerity.

Given that the song, and the video especially, has a very clear anti-Conservative, political message, The Guardian asked the band's spokesperson whether he supported Labour Party leader Jeremy Corbyn in the forthcoming election, to which he replied: "[I] just want to kick the Tories out however possible," adding that "I've been in the industry for 15 years and Captain SKA is the result of my total frustration with the apathetic response to the most right wing government in decades." The band also explained that "people are fed up with this government of the rich, for the rich. We're overwhelmed with the support and our message is that people do have the power to change society if we act together."

The band organised an official launch gig for the record, featuring a live performance of protest songs by the full ten-piece act, at the Brixton Jamm club in South London on Wednesday 7 June 2017, the day before the election polls were to open.

== Critical reception ==
Writing for The New York Times, Dan Bilefsky explained that the song had "a catchy chorus and a not-so-subtle message", considering it to be "scathing", and reporting that it "appears to have captured the national mood." Conservative Party politician Jacob Rees-Mogg wrote that "The People's Assembly is a hard-left pressure group that has put together a rather long-winded attack ad of the kind that is more familiar with elections in the United States than in the United Kingdom ... I am not sure anyone other than political obsessives will watch this rather tiresome video through to the end."

On BBC Radio's Newsbeat, May stated that she had heard portions of the song and that she was not very happy about it, stating that "I don't think anybody would [be happy] when they heard a song about themselves like that."

== Chart performance ==
By 31 May 2017, "Liar Liar GE2017" was the most-downloaded single of the day in the United Kingdom on both iTunes Store and Amazon Music. It charted at #4 on the UK Singles Chart dated 2 June 2017.

As of 30 May 2017, the official video had been viewed over 600,000 times on YouTube in the six days since it was uploaded. By the next day, 31 May 2017, that number had risen to over one million views. By 7 June 2017, the eve of the election, it had been seen over 2.5 million times.

Chart (2017)	Peak position
Scotland Singles (OCC)	2
UK Indie (OCC)	1
UK Singles (OCC)	4

== Airplay ==
Despite its chart performance, radio stations in the United Kingdom, including BBC Radio as well as commercial stations, widely refused to play "Liar Liar GE17", due to concerns that airplay of the song could violate broadcasting regulations in force during election campaign periods. The Representation of the People Act 1983, as well as the code of Ofcom, the United Kingdom's broadcasting regulator, contain rules regulating and restricting the media coverage of elections, effective upon the dissolution of Parliament following an election call. These include requirements for media coverage of elections to be impartial, the prohibition of political advertising (due to the party political broadcast system), and restrictions on election-related reporting on election day until polls close.

A representative of the BBC stated that "we do not ban songs or artists, however our editorial guidelines require us to remain impartial and the UK is currently in an election period so we will not be playing the song." Despite this, there have been calls for radio stations to freely broadcast the song, viewing the practice of withholding it as being censorship. On 2 June 2017, during The Official Chart broadcast, the band participated in a protest by the People's Assembly outside of Broadcasting House, the BBC's headquarters and the studio of BBC Radio 1.

In a Guardian editorial published 3 June, Captain SKA songwriters Christy Kulz and Jake Painter acknowledged the song's success without airplay as being an example of protest music "transcend[ing] the confines of conventional channels". However, they accused BBC Radio 1 of "going above and beyond the remit of Ofcom regulations" to censor the song by conspicuously preventing it from being streamed on the chart page of their website, thus "discouraging [readers] from accessing any viewpoints that could instigate critical thinking or debate." Citing the past censorship of the Sex Pistols' controversial single "God Save the Queen", they argued that the BBC "continually errs on the side of The Establishment", when their remit should be to serve the public. They argued that "there needs to be room for a richer and wider discussion" of political issues, such as power and privilege, rather than making younger audiences "tune out" politics.

== See also ==
- "Ding-Dong! The Witch Is Dead", which charted in the wake of the death of Margaret Thatcher but was not given airplay
- "Boris Johnson Is a Fucking Cunt", a song, followed by sequels, which also charted but was not given airplay
- United Kingdom government austerity programme
