= Captain SKA =

- Origin: London, England
- Genres: reggae; ska
- Years active: 2010–present
- Labels: Captain's Records
- Website: www.captainska.com

Captain SKA is a politically-active British band which produces and performs reggae and ska songs. The band is composed of unsigned, freelance session musicians. Members of the band have recorded and performed with artists including Culture Club, Paloma Faith, the Friendly Fires, Girls Aloud, The Streets, and Vampire Weekend.

== History ==
The band first came to prominence in 2010 with the release of the song "Liar Liar". At the time there were protests against a rise in college tuition fees in the UK, and the song had attacked the coalition government of the time, led by Conservative Prime Minister David Cameron and Liberal Democrat and Deputy Prime Minister Nick Clegg.

In 2011, they released another song attacking deputy prime minister Clegg. It was entitled "What's The Point Of Nick Clegg?"

In 2017, the band again rose to prominence with the success of a reworked version of "Liar Liar", titled "Liar Liar GE2017". The song was released in the run-up to the 2017 United Kingdom general election, with an accompanying video, that features music and vocals mixed with selected speeches and interviews by British Conservative politician and Prime Minister Theresa May. "Liar Liar GE2017" charted at Number 4 in the UK Singles Chart on 2 June 2017.

In May 2019, in response to Nigel Farage's Brexit Party performing well in polls leading up to the European Parliament election, the group released "Nigel Farage is a Racist".

== Ideology ==
The Guardian featured an opinion piece by Captain SKA songwriters Christy Kulz and Jake Painter, on 7 June 2017. Writing about the original song, "Liar Liar", they said that "It was a way to make politics more relevant and accessible to a wider audience, including young people, by challenging the 'I’m not into politics' refrain." The authors observed that young people are encouraged to "tune out of politics and focus on songs about sex, love and breakups," saying that while these latter issues are important, "there needs to be room for a richer and wider discussion" of political issues, such as power and privilege.

== Other media coverage ==
- Kulz, Christy; Painter, Jake (7 June 2017). "We wrote Liar Liar about David Cameron. But it works for Theresa May too". The Guardian. Guardian News and Media. Written by members of Captain SKA.

== See also ==
- United Kingdom government austerity programme
