= Bestie (Yungen song) =

Single by Yungen featuring Yxng Bane
- Released: 16 June 2017
- Genre: Afroswing
- Length: 3:39
- Label: RCA; Sony
- Songwriters: CJ Brooks; Larry Kiala
- Producer: ADP

Yungen singles chronology
"Bestie" (2017)	"Mind on It" (2018)

Yxng Bane singles chronology
"Bestie" (2017)	"Rihanna" (2017)

Music video
- "Bestie ft. Yxng Bane" on YouTube

"Bestie" is a song by English rapper Yungen, featuring English rapper/singer Yxng Bane. It is Yungen's highest charting single. It is also Yxng Bane's second-highest charting single, with his feature on "Answerphone" giving him a higher peak of number 5 in 2018.

== Music video ==
The music video for "Bestie" was released on Yungen's Vevo channel on 15 June 2017, one day before its official release on iTunes. As of April 2018, the video had accumulated over 30 million views. It was directed by Oliver Jennings and produced by Jack Hobbs. The video was shot in Dubai.

== Charts ==
=== Weekly charts ===
Weekly chart performance for "Bestie"
Chart (2017)	Peak position
Ireland (IRMA)	69
Scotland Singles (OCC)	27
UK Singles (OCC)	10
UK Hip Hop/R&B (OCC)	2

=== Year-end charts ===
Year-end chart performance for "Bestie"
Chart (2017)	Position
UK Singles (Official Charts Company)	70

== Certifications ==
Certifications for "Bestie"
Region	Certification	Certified units/sales
United Kingdom (BPI)	Platinum	600,000^{‡}
^{‡} Sales+streaming figures based on certification alone.
