= Dive (Ed Sheeran song) =

Song by Ed Sheeran

from the album ÷
- Released: 3 March 2017
- Recorded: 2016
- Genre: Pop; pop rock
- Length: 3:58
- Label: Asylum; Atlantic
- Songwriters: Benny Blanco; Ed Sheeran; Julia Michaels
- Producer: Benny Blanco

"Dive" is a song by English singer-songwriter Ed Sheeran. It was included on his third studio album ÷ (2017). It is the third track on the album. After the album's release, it charted at number 8 on the UK Singles Chart.

== Background ==
Sheeran wrote the song with Benny Blanco and Julia Michaels. In an interview with Zane Lowe, Sheeran said that he, Blanco and Michaels started working on the song in Malibu in March 2016 just before he left for a break in Japan. He had the riffs for the song, and first put down five or six riffs, and Michaels then sang 10 or 15 seconds on each. Later, after Sheeran had come back and reviewed the recordings, Michaels returned to flesh out the song with Sheeran and Blanco.

Jessie Ware provides backing vocal on this as well as two other songs on the album. The guitar solo in the song is credited to an anonymous guitarist named Angelo Mysterioso, and Sheeran revealed that he himself was also credited as Angelo Mysterioso in the guitarist's album (an individual of that name was credited on an Eric Clapton song, "I Will Be There", and Sheeran had performed the song with Clapton in concert).

== Critical reception ==
Taylor Weatherby of Billboard described the song as the one with the "most passionate vocal strains" of the album.

== Live performances ==
Sheeran performed the song with American country singer Luke Combs on 13 March 2022, at the C2C: Country to Country festival in London. Combs previously covered the song as an exclusive for Spotify in 2018, which would be certified Platinum by RIAA.

== Charts ==
=== Weekly charts ===
Chart (2017)	Peak position
Australia (ARIA)	5
Austria (Ö3 Austria Top 40)	26
Canada Hot 100 (Billboard)	19
Czech Republic Singles Digital (ČNS IFPI)	17
Denmark (Tracklisten)	13
France (SNEP)	67
Germany (GfK)	23
Hungary (Stream Top 40)	24
Ireland (IRMA)	11
Italy (FIMI)	29
Netherlands (Single Top 100)	12
New Zealand (Recorded Music NZ)	4
Norway (VG-lista)	24
Philippines (Philippine Hot 100)	4
Slovakia Singles Digital (ČNS IFPI)	13
Sweden (Sverigetopplistan)	28
UK Singles (OCC)	8
US Billboard Hot 100	49

2025 weekly chart performance for "Dive"
Chart (2025)	Peak position
Philippines (Philippines Hot 100)	60

=== Year-end charts ===
Chart (2017)	Position
UK Singles (Official Charts Company)	86

== Certifications ==
Region	Certification	Certified units/sales
Australia (ARIA)	3× Platinum	210,000^{‡}
Austria (IFPI Austria)	Gold	15,000^{‡}
Canada (Music Canada)	3× Platinum	240,000^{‡}
Denmark (IFPI Danmark)	Platinum	90,000^{‡}
France (SNEP)	Gold	100,000^{‡}
Italy (FIMI)	Platinum	50,000^{‡}
New Zealand (RMNZ)	4× Platinum	120,000^{‡}
Poland (ZPAV)	Platinum	50,000^{‡}
Portugal (AFP)	Platinum	10,000^{‡}
Spain (PROMUSICAE)	Gold	30,000^{‡}
United Kingdom (BPI)	2× Platinum	1,200,000^{‡}
United States (RIAA)	Platinum	1,000,000^{‡}
^{‡} Sales+streaming figures based on certification alone.
