= Yungen =

British rapper

- Born: Clive James Brooks; 1 February 1992 (age 34)
- Origin: Herne Hill, South London, England
- Genres: British hip hop, grime, R&B
- Years active: 2013–present
- Label: Sony RCA
- Website: www.yungenofficial.com

Clive James "CJ" Brooks (born 1 February 1992), known professionally as Yungen, is a British rapper, singer and songwriter from Herne Hill, South London. He first gained recognition for his 2011 freestyle video for SB.TV and in 2015 was nominated for Best Newcomer at the MOBO Awards. His 2017 song "Bestie" featuring Yxng Bane reached top 10 in the UK Singles Chart in October and became his first platinum single in February 2018.

== Early life ==
Clive James Brooks was born on 1 February 1992 and raised in Lairdale Estate. His mother is from Liverpool, making the family avid supporters of Liverpool F.C., and his father has Jamaican roots. Brooks listened to a diverse range of music genres growing up, with Wretch 32 and Giggs being among his major inspirations, though his father's brief time working as a hip-hop DJ and his three sisters' love of R&B would prove to be the dominant influences. He was inspired by Eminem and 50 Cent as he began rapping.

The name 'Yungen' came from Brooks' friends on the estate, who were all older than him. While he initially did not like the name, he later used it when he started recording in studios. As a young teenager, Brooks was inspired by an older cousin to try MCing, but it took several years to overcome his shyness enough to record anything for YouTube. He quit schooling after he was expelled at age 15. In 2008, when Brooks was 16, a close friend died while riding a moped and Brooks sat with him in his final moments. In the aftermath, Brooks decided to focus on being more responsible and serious.

== Career ==
=== 2009-2016 ===
After seeing Giggs, another estate-raised rapper, on TV, Brooks became serious about pursuing music as a career and released his first mixtape, Tha New Era Project, in 2009. In 2010, he uploaded a cover of Adele's single "Hometown Glory" to YouTube. When the video was reuploaded to the channel Yungen TV, it received interest from SB.TV founder Jamal Edwards, which led to SB.TV releasing his freestyle video "F64" in 2011. One of his earliest songs was "Hometown", which reflects on the death of his friend and remains the song that means the most to him. In 2012, he formed the group Play Dirty with Krept and Konan. His solo mixtape Topic of Discussion was released in April 2013. The same year, he started his own clothing line, Forever Yung.

In 2014, he supported Naughty Boy on his worldwide tour, traveling to the UAE, Australia, and across Europe. The same year, he released the two-part Project Black and Red, which featured artists Stormzy, Wretch 32, and Krept and Konan. That August, Brooks released "Ain't on Nuttin" with rapper Sneakbo. The two remixes (Part 1 and Part 2) featured rappers such as Section Boyz, Bashy, Stormzy and Ghetts. He also released "Don't Take It Personal", a song exploring darker themes from his childhood, including being kidnapped by another estate resident, on his SoundCloud. That November, he played a sold-out gig at the O_{2} Academy Islington.

After the release of Project Black and Red, Brooks was nominated for the 2015 MOBO Best Newcomer Award and signed his first record contract with Sony RCA that November. BBC Radio 1Xtra named him one of the hottest new artists to watch for 2016, and in February he released his single "Comfy". Brooks independently released the single "You Don't Know Me Like That" on 5 February, followed by "Off the Record 2" (Sony) in April. His sold-out show at Village Underground was shortly followed by the R&B-inspired "Take My Number" featuring Angel on 10 May; "Cuffing Season" under House of Forever on 24 November; and "Do It Right", a collaboration with Sneakbo featuring Haile of WSTRN, on 6 December.

That year, he also gained publicity for a verbal disagreement with the rapper Chip. The argument began when Chip implied that Brooks did not deserve his MOBO Award nomination, which escalated to releasing diss tracks about each other. When the dispute was resolved, this exposure ultimately helped both their rapping credibility, and their music reached a wider audience. Brooks told Gulf Times in 2017 that he found the feud funny, especially when one of Chip's tracks argued that Chip's mom's house was nicer than Brooks' mom's house; Brooks threatened to "tip over Chip's Smart Car" in response.

=== 2017-present ===
Brooks became the face of the Converse Chuck Taylor All Star x Nike Flyknit shoe in 2017 and headlined the launch event at Victoria House, London in April. His single "Fools Gold" was released shortly after. Brooks performed another sold-out show, this time at KOKO with Yxng Bane as the supporting artist. Brooks' first single of 2017, "Bestie" featuring Yxng Bane, was released in June and climbed the UK Charts, reaching the top 10 in October and achieving Gold status in November, followed by Platinum in February 2018. The song's music video was filmed spontaneously in Dubai where the rapper was on a holiday. During this trip, Brooks asked Yxng Bane to fly out to film it. The music video shows them quad biking in the desert.

Brooks performed at a number of festivals in the summer of 2017, including his headline set on the second stage at Wireless Festival in July. He then played Jamaica House at the Indigo at the O2 on 10 August, and the V Festival on 20 August. In September, Brooks announced that his The Chosen Tour would begin on 16 November in Glasgow and end on 1 December at the Dublin Academy. He followed the announcement with two giveaway tracks: "Chosen" on 13 October and "All Night" featuring Mr Eazi on 27 October. Tickets for the Chosen Tour, including those for Shepherd's Bush Empire, sold out.

Brooks featured on Steel Banglez's, "Bad" in November 2017 alongside MoStack, Mr Eazi and Not3s. This song reached #30 on the UK Singles Chart. In 2018, he teamed up with Clean Bandit and Julia Michaels to release a remix of "I Miss You" on 5 January. He collaborated with Timberland in 2019 to release the Brooklyn collection, a retro-inspired trainer. The same year, he released his nine-track album Project Purple, which featured Dappy and One Acen, and did an album tour. He also appeared at the SW4 and We Are festivals. In 2019, he modeled for the Street Training range from New Balance and Liverpool F.C.

In 2020, he released the singles "Handsome", featuring M24 in April and "Mané & Salah" (named for Liverpool players Sadio Mané and Mo Salah) in July. In February 2022, Brooks put out the single "Popstar" as a lead-up to his next album, Passionate & Paranoid, which featured artists Ghetts, Krept and Konan, and Avelino. Brooks' first single of 2024 was "Dave & Cench Type Beat", a song reminiscent of Dave and Central Cee's 2023 beat "Sprinter". Brooks' August release, "Is This What You Want?", was accompanied by a music video.

== Discography ==
=== Albums ===
- Project Black & Red (2014)
- Project Purple (2019)
- Passionate & Paranoid (2022)

=== Mixtapes ===
- Topic of Discussion (2013)

=== Singles ===
==== As lead artist ====
List of singles as lead artist, with selected chart positions, showing year released and album name
Title	Year	Peak chart positions		Certifications	Album
Title	Year	UK	UK R&B	Certifications	Album
"Money, Doe, Paper"	2013	—	—		Non-album singles
"Take My Number" (featuring Angel)	2016	—	—	BPI: Silver	Non-album singles
"Bestie" (featuring Yxng Bane)	2017	10	2	BPI: Platinum	Non-album singles
"All Night" (featuring Mr Eazi)	2017	98	—		Non-album singles
"Mind on It" (featuring Jess Glynne)	2018	47	27		Non-album singles
"Intimate" (featuring Craig David)	2018	—	—		Non-album singles
"Pricey" (featuring One Acen)	2018	94	—		Project Purple
"Comfortable" (featuring Dappy)	2019	32	18	BPI: Silver	Project Purple
"Dubai to Ibiza"	2023	—	—		Non-album single
"—" denotes a recording that did not chart or was not released in that territory.

==== As featured artist ====
List of singles as featured artist, with selected chart positions, showing year released and album name
Title	Year	Peak chart positions		Certifications	Album
Title	Year	UK	UK R&B	Certifications	Album
"Bad" (Steel Banglez featuring Yungen, MoStack, Mr Eazi and Not3s)	2017	29	19	BPI: Platinum	Non-album single
"Miss Diva" (One Acen featuring Yungen)	2019	66	34	BPI: Silver	Non-album single
"—" denotes a recording that did not chart or was not released in that territory.

== Awards and nominations ==
Year	Award	Category	Recipients and nominees	Result
2015	MOBO Awards	Best Newcomer	Yungen	Nominated
2015	NME Awards	Best Newcomer	Yungen	Nominated
2016	Urban Music Awards	Best Grime Act	Yungen	Nominated
2016	Urban Music Awards	Best Male Act	Yungen	Nominated
2017	MOBO Awards	Best Song	"Bestie" featuring Yxng Bane	Nominated
2017	Urban Music Awards	Best Song	"Bestie" featuring Yxng Bane	Nominated
2017	Urban Music Awards	Best Male Act	Yungen	Nominated
2018	NME Awards	Best Collaboration	"Bestie" featuring Yxng Bane	Nominated
2018	Global Awards	Rising Star Award	Yungen	Nominated
