= Lewis Capaldi discography =

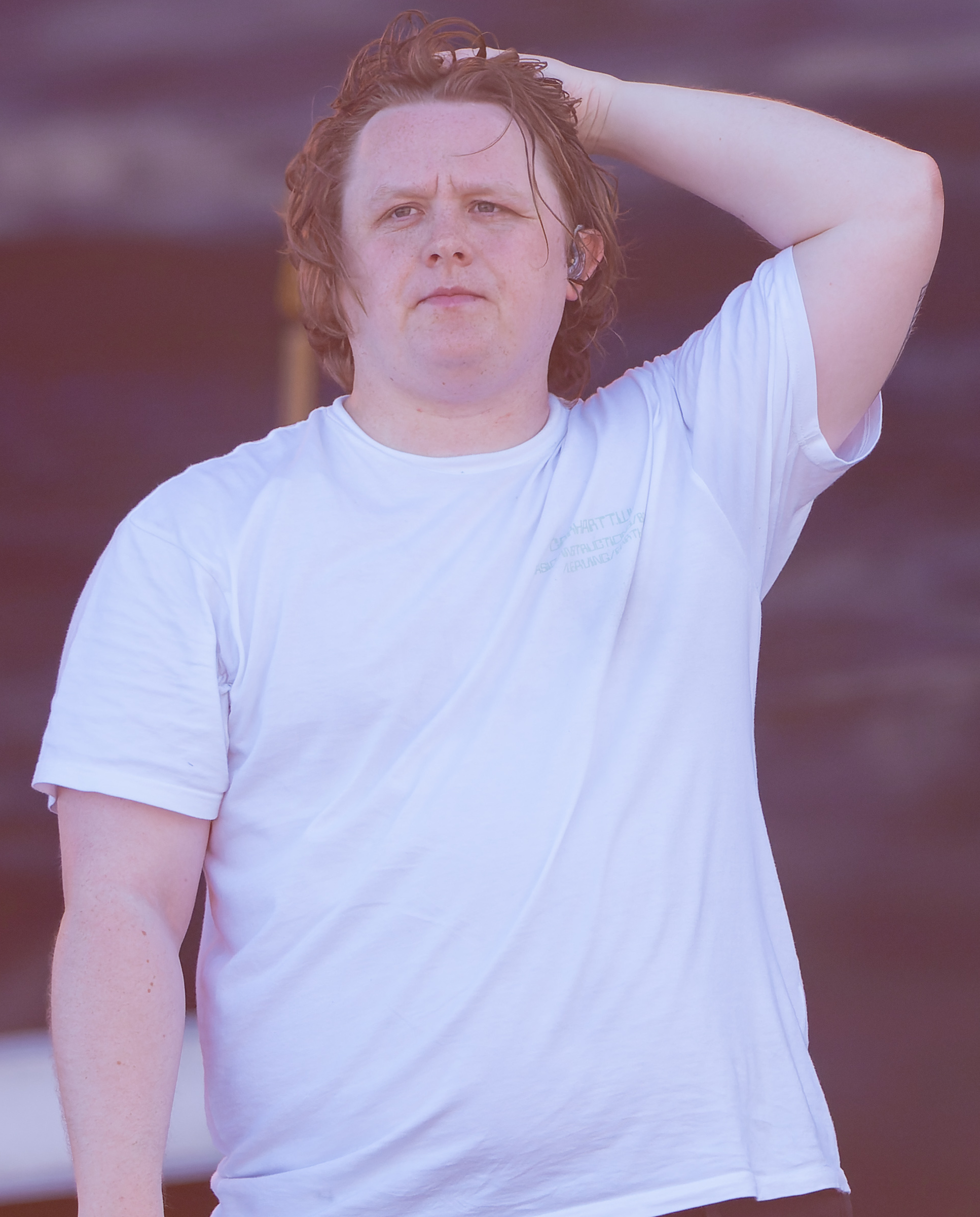
- Lewis Capaldi performing at the 2023 Glastonbury Festival
- Studio albums: 2
- EPs: 11
- Singles: 20
- Promotional singles: 1

The discography of Scottish singer Lewis Capaldi consists of two studio albums, eleven extended plays and twenty singles. He achieved global mainstream success in 2019 with his breakthrough single "Someone You Loved", which charted in over 29 countries and spent seven weeks at number one on the UK Singles Chart. His debut album Divinely Uninspired to a Hellish Extent followed in May, which became the best selling album in the UK in five years, spending five weeks at number one in its first six weeks of release. It includes the top 10 single "Grace", the UK and US number one single "Someone You Loved" and "Hold Me While You Wait", among several songs previously included on Capaldi's 2017 and 2018 EPs Bloom and Breach, respectively. Capaldi went on tour in support of the record in May 2019, and finished the tour in October 2019. It peaked at number one in the UK and Ireland, becoming the fastest-selling album of the year and also outselling all of the top 10 combined in both countries. It was certified gold in the UK a week after its release. The album was the best selling album in the UK in 2019 and 2020, with "Someone You Loved" being the best selling single of 2019 in the UK.

His second studio album Broken by Desire to Be Heavenly Sent (2023) was preceded by three singles—the UK number ones "Forget Me", "Pointless" and "Wish You the Best", as well as the promotional single "How I'm Feeling Now"—and promoted with a 2023 world tour as well as a Netflix documentary titled Lewis Capaldi: How I'm Feeling Now. Upon its release, Broken by Desire to Be Heavenly Sent had become the fastest selling album of 2023 in the United Kingdom, outselling the rest of the albums within the UK Top 20 during its first week of release. It debuted at number one in the United Kingdom, Australia, the Netherlands, Ireland, New Zealand and his native Scotland. It reached a peak of number fourteen on the US Billboard 200.

== Albums ==
=== Studio albums ===
Title	Details	Peak chart positions										Certifications
Title	Details	SCO	AUS	BEL	GER	IRE	NOR	NZ	SWI	UK	US	Certifications
Divinely Uninspired to a Hellish Extent	Released: 17 May 2019; Label: Vertigo, Universal, Capitol; Format: CD, LP, download, streaming	1	7	6	7	1	1	3	3	1	20	BPI: 6× Platinum; ARIA: Platinum; BVMI: Gold; IFPI NOR: 4× Platinum; MC: 6× Platinum; RMNZ: 7× Platinum
Broken by Desire to Be Heavenly Sent	Released: 19 May 2023; Label: Vertigo, Universal, Capitol; Formats: CD, LP, cassette, download, streaming	1	1	2	4	1	2	1	2	1	14	BPI: Platinum; IFPI DEN: Gold; MC: Gold; RMNZ: Platinum

=== Live albums ===
Title	Details
Live from Wembley (Note: Included in Divinely Uninspired to a Hellish Extent: Finale)	Released: 4 December 2020; Label: Vertigo, Universal; Format: CD

== Extended plays ==
Title	Details	Peak chart positions		
Title	Details	SCO	CAN	UK Down.
Bloom	Released: 20 October 2017; Label: Vertigo, Universal; Format: Digital download, streaming	—	—	—
Breach	Released: 8 November 2018; Label: Vertigo, Universal; Format: Digital download, streaming	—	95	—
Deezer Sessions	Released: 16 November 2018; Label: Vertigo, Universal; Format: Streaming	—	—	—
Spotify Singles	Released: 12 June 2019; Label: Vertigo, Universal; Format: Streaming, LP	—	—	—
Up Next Live from Apple Champs-Élysées	Released: 30 August 2019; Label: Vertigo, Universal; Format: Digital download, streaming	—	—	—
To Tell the Truth I Can't Believe We Got This Far	Released: 15 May 2020; Label: Vertigo, Universal; Format: Digital download, streaming	8	—	5
Cry Yourself to Sleep	Released: 25 February 2022; Label: Vertigo, Universal; Format: Digital download, streaming	—	—	—
Spotify Singles	Released: 22 September 2022; Label: Vertigo, Universal; Format: Streaming, LP	—	—	—
All the Rest	Released: 16 May 2025; Label: Vertigo, Universal; Format: Digital download, streaming	—	—	—
Survive	Released: 14 November 2025; Label: Vertigo, Universal; Format: Digital download, streaming, LP	—	—	—
Live from North America	Released: 8 May 2026; Label: Vertigo, Universal; Format: Digital download, streaming, LP	—	—	— (Note: Live from North America did not appear on the UK Album Downloads Chart, but peaked at number 11 on the Singles Sales Chart.)
"—" denotes a recording that did not chart or was not released in that territory.

== Singles ==
Title	Year	Peak chart positions										Certifications	Album
Title	Year	UK	AUS	BEL	CAN	IRE	NOR	NZ	SWE	SWI	US	Certifications	Album
"Bruises" (original or live orchestral version)	2017	6	46	— (Note: "Bruises" did not enter the Flemish Ultratop 50, but peaked at number three on the Ultratip chart.)	67	8	15	40	43	42	— (Note: "Bruises" did not enter the Billboard Hot 100, but peaked at number 22 on the Bubbling Under Hot 100 chart.)	BPI: 5× Platinum; ARIA: 7× Platinum; GLF: Platinum; MC: 8× Platinum; RMNZ: 6× Platinum	Bloom (Note: "Bruises", "Lost on You" and "Fade" also feature on Capaldi's album Divinely Uninspired to a Hellish Extent.)
"Lost on You"	2017	— (Note: "Lost on you" did not enter the UK Singles Chart, as chart rules only allow three songs per artist to chart within the top 100 at a time, but peaked at number 38 on the UK Streaming Chart.)	—	—	—	—	—	—	—	—	—	BPI: Platinum; ARIA: Gold; MC: Gold; RMNZ: Gold	Bloom
"Fade"	2017	— (Note: "Fade" did not enter the UK Singles Chart, as chart rules only allow three songs per artist to chart within the top 100 at a time, but peaked at number 52 on the UK Streaming Chart.)	—	—	—	—	—	—	—	—	—	BPI: Gold	Bloom
"Rush" (featuring Jessie Reyez)	2018	—	—	—	—	—	—	—	—	—	—	BPI: Gold; ARIA: Gold; RMNZ: Gold	Non-album single
"Tough"	2018	—	—	—	—	39	—	—	—	—	—	BPI: Gold; ARIA: Gold	Breach
"Grace"	2018	9	—	—	—	10	—	—	—	—	—	BPI: 3× Platinum; ARIA: 2× Platinum; MC: Gold; RMNZ: Platinum	Breach (Note: "Grace" and "Someone You Loved" also feature on Capaldi's album Divinely Uninspired to a Hellish Extent.)
"Someone You Loved"	2018	1	4	2	1	1	3	4	6	3	1	BPI: 11× Platinum; ARIA: 23× Platinum; BRMA: 4× Platinum; GLF: 3× Platinum; IFPI NOR: Platinum; MC: 2× Diamond; RIAA: Diamond; RMNZ: 12× Platinum	Breach
"Hold Me While You Wait"	2019	4	—	— (Note: "Hold Me While You Wait" did not enter the Flemish Ultratop 50, but peaked at number 20 on the Ultratip chart.)	—	1	—	— (Note: "Hold Me While You Wait" did not enter the NZ Top 40 Singles Chart, but peaked at number 13 on the NZ Top 40 Hot Singles.)	77	63	—	BPI: 4× Platinum; ARIA: 4× Platinum; MC: 5× Platinum; RMNZ: 4× Platinum	Divinely Uninspired to a Hellish Extent (Note: "Before You Go" is only included on expanded edition of Capaldi's album Divinely Uninspired to a Hellish Extent.)
"Before You Go"	2019	1	7	2	16	1	9	9	23	5	9	BPI: 5× Platinum; ARIA: 9× Platinum; BRMA: 2× Platinum; MC: 5× Platinum; RIAA: Platinum; RMNZ: 7× Platinum	Divinely Uninspired to a Hellish Extent
"Forget Me"	2022	1	21	5	11	2	13	22	35	38	58	BPI: Platinum; ARIA: 2× Platinum; BRMA: Gold; RMNZ: 2× Platinum	Broken by Desire to Be Heavenly Sent (Note: "Strangers" is only included on expanded edition of Capaldi's album Broken by Desire to Be Heavenly Sent.)
"Pointless"	2022	1	—	34	—	7	—	— (Note: "Pointless" did not enter the NZ Top 40 Singles Chart, but peaked at number four on the NZ Hot Singles Chart.)	48	61	—	BPI: Platinum; ARIA: Gold; RMNZ: Gold	Broken by Desire to Be Heavenly Sent
"Wish You the Best"	2023	1	23	16	19	4	28	22	77	34	— (Note: "Wish You the Best" did not enter the Billboard Hot 100, but peaked at number three on the Bubbling Under Hot 100 chart.)	BPI: Platinum; ARIA: Platinum; BRMA: Gold; MC: 2× Platinum; RMNZ: Platinum	Broken by Desire to Be Heavenly Sent
"Strangers"	2024	37	—	48	—	70	—	— (Note: "Strangers" did not enter the NZ Top 40 Singles Chart, but peaked at number 12 on the NZ Hot Singles Chart.)	42	—	—		Broken by Desire to Be Heavenly Sent
"Love the Hell Out of You"	2024	—	—	—	—	71	—	— (Note: "Love the Hell Out of You" did not enter the NZ Top 40 Singles Chart, but peaked at number 15 on the NZ Hot Singles Chart.)	—	—	—	BPI: Silver	It Ends with Us
"Everytime" (BBC Radio 1 Live Lounge)	2025	— (Note: "Everytime" did not enter the UK Singles Chart but debuted at number 36 on the UK Singles Downloads Chart and at number 58 on the UK Singles Sales Chart.)	—	—	—	—	—	—	—	—	—		Non-album single
"Survive"	2025	1	71	30	92	4	72	— (Note: "Survive" did not enter the NZ Top 40 Singles Chart, but peaked at number 8 on the NZ Hot Singles Chart.)	—	17	—	BPI: Gold	Survive (Note: "Stay Love" is only included on reissued edition of Capaldi's EP Survive.)
"Something in the Heavens"	2025	3	—	—	—	13	51	— (Note: "Something in the Heavens" did not enter the NZ Top 40 Singles Chart, but peaked at number 2 on the NZ Hot Singles Chart.)	89	86	—	BPI: Silver	Survive
"Almost"	2025	44	—	—	—	66	—	— (Note: "Almost" did not enter the NZ Top 40 Singles Chart, but peaked at number 16 on the NZ Hot Singles Chart.)	—	—	—		Survive
"The Day That I Die"	2025	27	—	33	—	80	—	— (Note: "The Day That I Die" did not enter the NZ Top 40 Singles Chart, but peaked at number 17 on the NZ Hot Singles Chart.)	—	—	—		Survive
"Stay Love"	2026	68	—	—	—	93	—	— (Note: "Stay Love" did not enter the NZ Top 40 Singles Chart, but peaked at number 9 on the NZ Hot Singles Chart.)	—	—	—		Survive
"—" denotes a recording that did not chart or was not released in that territory.

=== Promotional singles ===
Title	Year	Peak chart positions				Certifications	Album
Title	Year	IRE	NZ Hot	SWE Heat.	UK	Certifications	Album
"How I'm Feeling Now"	2023	20	10	9	24	BPI: Silver	Broken by Desire to Be Heavenly Sent

== Other charted or certified songs ==
Title	Year	Peak chart positions					Certifications	Album
Title	Year	SCO	IRE	NZ Hot	SWE Heat.	UK	Certifications	Album
"Mercy"	2017	—	—	—	—	—	BPI: Silver	Bloom
"Maybe"	2019	28	—	33	—	— (Note: "Maybe" did not enter the UK Singles Chart, as chart rules only allow three songs per artist to chart within the top 100 at a time, but peaked at number 31 on the UK Streaming Chart.)	BPI: Gold	Divinely Uninspired to a Hellish Extent
"Forever"	2019	30	—	—	—	— (Note: "Forever" did not enter the UK Singles Chart, as chart rules only allow three songs per artist to chart within the top 100 at a time, but peaked at number 25 on the UK Streaming Chart.)	BPI: Platinum; ARIA: Platinum; MC: 2× Platinum; RMNZ: Gold	Divinely Uninspired to a Hellish Extent
"One"	2019	26	6	23	—	— (Note: "One" did not enter the UK Singles Chart, as chart rules only allow three songs per artist to chart within the top 100 at a time, but peaked at number 18 on the UK Streaming Chart.)	BPI: Platinum; ARIA: Gold; MC: Gold; RMNZ: Gold	Divinely Uninspired to a Hellish Extent
"Don't Get Me Wrong"	2019	54	—	—	—	— (Note: "Don't Get Me Wrong" did not enter the UK Singles Chart, as chart rules only allow three songs per artist to chart within the top 100 at a time, but peaked at number 43 on the UK Streaming Chart.)	BPI: Silver	Divinely Uninspired to a Hellish Extent
"Hollywood"	2019	38	—	—	—	— (Note: "Hollywood" did not enter the UK Singles Chart, as chart rules only allow three songs per artist to chart within the top 100 at a time, but peaked at number 39 on the UK Streaming Chart.)	BPI: Gold; MC: Gold	Divinely Uninspired to a Hellish Extent
"Headspace"	2019	84	—	—	—	— (Note: "Headspace" did not enter the UK Singles Chart, as chart rules only allow three songs per artist to chart within the top 100 at a time, but peaked at number 62 on the UK Streaming Chart.)	BPI: Silver	Divinely Uninspired to a Hellish Extent
"When the Party's Over"	2019	—	15	15	7	—	BPI: Silver; ARIA: Gold; RMNZ: Gold	Spotify Singles
"Leaving My Love Behind"	2019	11	—	—	—	—	BPI: Silver	Divinely Uninspired to a Hellish Extent
"Let It Roll"	2019	14	—	—	—	—		Divinely Uninspired to a Hellish Extent
"Heavenly Kind of State of Mind"	2023	—	—	13	—	—		Broken by Desire to Be Heavenly Sent
"Haven't You Ever Been in Love Before?"	2023	—	28	5	4	28	BPI: Silver	Broken by Desire to Be Heavenly Sent
"The Pretender"	2023	—	42	12	—	— (Note: "The Pretender" did not enter the UK Singles Chart, as chart rules only allow three songs per artist to chart within the top 100 at a time, but peaked at number 94 on the UK Audio Streaming Chart.)		Broken by Desire to Be Heavenly Sent
"A Cure for Minds Unwell"	2024	—	73	37	—	59		Broken by Desire to Be Heavenly Sent
"—" denotes a recording that did not chart or was not released in that territory.

== Songwriting credits ==
List of songs written or co-written for other artists, showing year released and album name
Song	Year	Artist	Album	Ref.
"How to Be Lonely"	2020	Rita Ora	Non-album single	
"Lasting Lover" (with James Arthur)	2020	Sigala	Every Cloud	
"Never Really Loved Me" (Note: Credited as 'Anita Jobby') (with Dean Lewis)	2022	Kygo	Thrill of the Chase	
"Luv Me a Little" (with Nina Nesbitt)	2023	Illenium	Illenium	
"Heart by Heart"	2025	Joe Jonas	Music for People Who Believe in Love	

== Guest appearances ==
List of guest appearances
Song	Year	Artist	Album	Ref.
"Can't Help Falling in Love/ Mamma Mia"	2019	Lewis Capaldi	BBC Radio 2: The Piano Room 2019	
"Days Gone Quiet"	2019	Lewis Capaldi	Days Gone (Original Soundtrack)	
"Shallow" (Note: Also featured on To Tell The Truth I Can't Believe We Got This Far)	2019	Lewis Capaldi	BBC Radio 1's Live Lounge: The Collection	
"Everywhere (BBC Children in Need)" (Note: Credited for percussion work)	2021	Anne-Marie & Niall Horan	Non-album single	
