= List of awards and nominations received by Lewis Capaldi =

Lewis Capaldi awards and nominations
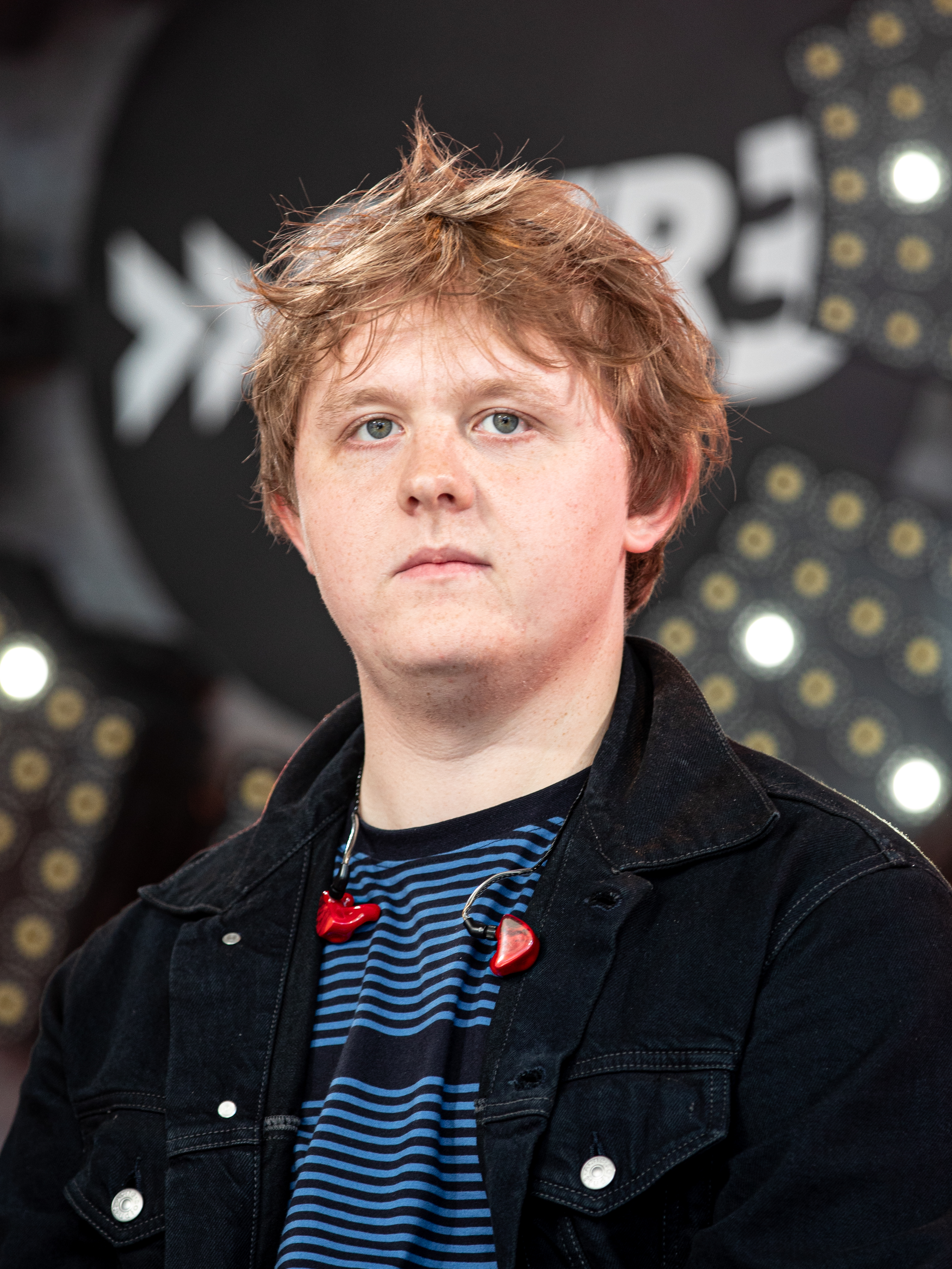
- Capaldi at the SWR3 New Pop Festival 2019
Awards and nominations
Award	Wins	Nominations
American Music Awards	0	3
Billboard	0	2
Brit	3	6
Grammy	0	2
Ivor Novello	0	3
MTV Europe	0	1
MTV VMA	0	1

Totals (Note: Certain award groups do not simply award one winner. They acknowledge several different recipients, have runners-up, and have third place. Since this is a specific recognition and is different from losing an award, runner-up mentions are considered wins in this award tally. For simplification and to avoid errors, each award in this list has been presumed to have had a prior nomination.)
- Wins: 24
- Nominations: 57

Below is a comprehensive listing of awards and nominations received by Scottish singer Lewis Capaldi, who achieved breakthrough success in 2018 with the release of his single "Someone You Loved" which was a commercial success, peaking at No. 1 on the UK Singles Chart. The song became Capaldi's first No. 1 single, spending seven consecutive weeks atop the chart and was the best selling single of 2019 in the UK. It also peaked at No. 1 on the Irish Singles Chart, the Canadian Hot 100, and the Recording Industry Association of Malaysia singles chart. In the United States, "Someone You Loved" was a sleeper hit, topping the Billboard Hot 100 in its 24th week on the chart. The song is certified Diamond or higher in Australia, Brazil, Canada, France, Germany, Poland, and the United States. It was nominated for Song of the Year at the 62nd Grammy Awards. It also received an award for Song of the Year at the 2020 Brit Awards. As of 2023, "Someone You Loved" is the 3rd most streamed song on Spotify, with over 3 billion streams on the platform.

In 2017, he won the Scottish Alternative Music Awards for Best Acoustic Act, and the same year, won the award for Best Breakthrough Artist at the Scottish Music Awards. His debut album, Divinely Uninspired to a Hellish Extent (2019) received a nomination for the Brit Award for British Album of the Year in 2020. In total, he was nominated for four awards at the 2020 BRIT Awards, winning two – the Brit Award for Best New Artist and the Brit Award for Song of the Year (for "Someone You Loved"). At the 62nd Annual Grammy Awards, "Someone You Loved" was nominated for Song of the Year, subsequently losing out to "Bad Guy". In 2024, he was nominated for a Grammy Award for Best Music Film at the 66th Annual Grammy Awards. "Someone You Loved" won the Best Track award at the 2019 Q Awards. Other major awards in which Capaldi has been nominated include the MTV Video Music Award for Best New Artist, the Billboard Music Award for Top Hot 100 Song and the Billboard Music Award for Top Radio Song and nominated twice for Most Performed Work at the Ivor Novello Awards for "Someone You Loved" and "Before You Go" respectively.

== Overview of awards and nominations ==
Awards and nominations for Lewis Capaldi
Year	Organisation	Category/Award	Work	Result	Ref.
2017	Scottish Alternative Music Awards	Best Acoustic Act	Himself	Won	
2017	Scottish Music Awards	Best Breakthrough Artist Award	Himself	Won	
2018	Great Scot Awards	Breakthrough	Himself	Won	
2018	Forth Awards	Rising Star Award	Himself	Won	
2019	Brit Awards	Critics' Choice Award	Himself	Nominated	
2019	Q Awards	Best Track	"Someone You Loved"	Won	
2019	NRJ Music Awards	International Song of the Year	"Someone You Loved"	Nominated	
2019	NRJ Music Awards	International Revelation of the Year	Himself	Nominated	
2019	BBC Teen Awards	Best British Singer	"Someone You Loved"	Won	
2019	BBC Teen Awards	Best Single	Himself	Won	
2020	NAVTGR Awards	Song, Original or Adapted	"Days Gone Quiet"	Nominated	
2020	Game Audio Network Guild Awards	Best Original Song	"Days Gone Quiet"	Nominated	
2020	Grammy Awards	Song of the Year	"Someone You Loved"	Nominated	
2020	iHeartRadio Music Awards	Best Lyrics	"Someone You Loved"	Nominated	
2020	iHeartRadio Music Awards	Best New Pop Artist	Himself	Nominated	
2020	Brit Awards	Male Solo Artist	Himself	Nominated	
2020	Brit Awards	Best New Artist	Himself	Won	
2020	Brit Awards	Song of the Year	"Someone You Loved"	Won	
2020	Brit Awards	Album of the Year	Divinely Uninspired to a Hellish Extent	Nominated	
2020	Global Awards	Best Male	Himself	Nominated	
2020	Global Awards	Best British Act	Himself	Nominated	
2020	Global Awards	Best Mass Appeal Artist	Himself	Won	
2020	Global Awards	Most Played Song	"Someone You Loved"	Won	
2020	Global Awards	Best Song of 2019	"Someone You Loved"	Nominated	
2020	Kids' Choice Awards	Favorite Breakout New Artist	Himself	Nominated	
2020	LOS40 Music Awards	Best International New Act	Himself	Nominated	
2020	LOS40 Music Awards	Best International Album	Divinely Uninspired to a Hellish Extent	Nominated	
2020	LOS40 Music Awards	Best International Song	"Before You Go"	Nominated	
2020	MTV Video Music Awards	Push Best New Artist	Himself	Nominated	
2020	Ivor Novello Awards	Most Performed Work	"Hold Me While You Wait"	Nominated	
2020	Ivor Novello Awards	Most Performed Work	"Someone You Loved"	Nominated	
2020	Billboard Music Awards	Top Hot 100 Song	"Someone You Loved"	Nominated	
2020	Billboard Music Awards	Top Radio Song	"Someone You Loved"	Nominated	
2020	UK Music Video Awards	Best Pop Video – UK	"Before You Go"	Nominated	
2020	American Music Awards	New Artist of the Year	Himself	Nominated	
2020	American Music Awards	Favorite Artist – Adult Contemporary	Himself	Nominated	
2020	American Music Awards	Favorite Song – Pop/Rock	"Someone You Loved"	Nominated	
2020	Scottish Music Awards	Best UK Artist	Himself	Won	
2020	iHeartRadio Titanium Awards	1 Billion Total Audience Spins on iHeartRadio Stations	"Someone You Loved"	Won	
2021	iHeartRadio Titanium Awards	1 Billion Total Audience Spins on iHeartRadio Stations	"Before You Go"	Won	
2021	iHeartRadio Music Awards	Best Lyrics	"Before You Go"	Nominated	
2021	Ivor Novello Awards	Most Performed Work	"Someone You Loved"	Nominated	
2021	Ivor Novello Awards	Most Performed Work	"Before You Go"	Nominated	
2021	Billboard Music Awards	Top Radio Songs Artist	Himself	Nominated	
2021	ASCAP London Music Awards	Songwriter of the Year	Himself	Won	
2021	ASCAP London Music Awards	Winning Hot 100 Song	"Before You Go"	Won	
2021	ASCAP London Music Awards	Song of the Year	"Someone You Loved"	Won	
2021	ASCAP London Music Awards	Top Streaming Song	"Someone You Loved"	Won	
2022	NRJ Music Awards	International Video of the Year	"Forget Me"	Nominated	
2022	ASCAP London Music Awards	Winning Hot Dance/Electronic Song	"Lasting Lover"	Won	
2022	MTV Europe Music Awards	Best UK & Ireland Act	Himself	Nominated	
2023	Brit Awards	Song of The Year	"Forget Me"	Nominated	
2023	Global Awards	Best Song	"Forget Me"	Nominated	
2023	Global Awards	Mass Appeal Award	Himself	Won	
2023	Global Awards	Best Male	Himself	Nominated	
2023	Global Awards	Best British Act	Himself	Nominated	
2023	British Phonographic Industry	Brits Billion Award	Himself	Won	
2023	National Television Awards	Best Authored Documentary	Lewis Capaldi: How I'm Feeling Now	Won	
2023	British Academy Scotland Awards	Audience Award: Favorite Scot on Screen	Lewis Capaldi: How I'm Feeling Now	Nominated	
2023	Rolling Stone UK Awards	The Gamechanger Award	Himself	Won	
2024	Grammy Awards	Best Music Film	Lewis Capaldi: How I'm Feeling Now	Nominated	
2024	Brit Awards	Song of The Year	"Wish You the Best"	Nominated	
2025	Rolling Stone UK Awards	The Artist Award	Himself	Won	
2026	Brit Awards	Song of The Year	"Survive"	Nominated	
