= Love the Hell Out of You =

2024 single by Lewis Capaldi

Single by Lewis Capaldi

from the album Broken by Desire to Be Heavenly Sent
- Released: 9 August 2024
- Genre: Pop
- Length: 3:25
- Label: Vertigo; Universal
- Songwriters: Lewis Capaldi; Phil Plested; Michael Pollack; Tom Barnes; Pete Kelleher; Ben Kohn
- Producers: Lewis Capaldi; Chris Bishop; TMS

Lewis Capaldi singles chronology
"Strangers" (2024)	"Love the Hell Out of You" (2024)	"Survive" (2025)

"Love the Hell Out of You" is a song by Scottish singer-songwriter Lewis Capaldi. It was originally featured as a track on Capaldi's second studio album, Broken by Desire to Be Heavenly Sent, on 19 May 2023, but was later featured in the 2024 film It Ends with Us. As a result, the song resurged in popularity and was released as a single, along with an extended play of the same name, on 9 August 2024.

== Background and release ==
In August 2024, over a year after its original release as an album track in 2023, "Love the Hell Out of You" resurged in popularity after it was featured in the film It Ends with Us. As a result, the song was retitled "Love the Hell Out of You (From the Motion Picture 'It Ends with Us')" on streaming and digital platforms. The song was also released as a single, and an extended play featuring the original version of the song, alongside piano acoustic, guitar acoustic and string versions of the song, was released on the same day as the film, on 9 August 2024. By 25 August 2025, the song was retitled back to "Love the Hell Out of You" on streaming and digital platforms. Although it was never serviced to radio, in January 2025, the song unofficially received airplay on Pittsburgh Top 40 radio station WBZZ "100.7 Star".

According to Capaldi, the song is about "doing something for someone that they've always done for you." In an interview with Apple Music, he shares that the song was written on the same day as the lead single of the album, "Forget Me", and that it was "very quick". He says, "When I came in, Phil [Plested] and Michael [Pollack] were knocking around this idea of, like, loving the hell out of someone in the sense you love them so much but that idea of also someone loving you so much that they’ve taken away all this shit that you’re going through."

According to a press release, the song plays "during a pivotal moment of the film." In a statement about the song selection, American actress Blake Lively, who stars as Lily Bloom in the film, states, "There was only one song for this moment. Once you see it, you’ll feel it for yourself. Lewis Capaldi is beloved for not only his brilliant work, but who he is. I couldn’t be more proud that he told this story with us. This is an honor; I will be grateful for forever. This movie means the world to me."

== Critical reception ==
Ryan Bulbeck of Renowned for Sound says the song is "a gorgeous swung ballad, complete with Capaldi’s trademark gravelly voice and soft piano." Katie Colombus of The Arts Desk declares that "Love the Hell Out of You" "will be the ultimate first wedding track from hereon in." Sarah Verschoor of Riff Magazine describes the song as "a response" to "the fears that come with being loved" as Capaldi grapples with them.

== Charts ==
Chart performance for "Love the Hell Out of You"
Chart (2024)	Peak position
Ireland (IRMA)	71
New Zealand (Recorded Music NZ)	15

== Certifications ==
Certifications for "Love the Hell Out of You"
Region	Certification	Certified units/sales
United Kingdom (BPI)	Silver	200,000^{‡}
^{‡} Sales+streaming figures based on certification alone.
