= How I'm Feeling Now (song) =

2023 promotional single by Lewis Capaldi

- Promotional cover artwork

Promotional single by Lewis Capaldi

from the album Broken by Desire to Be Heavenly Sent
- Released: 17 March 2023
- Genre: Pop
- Length: 3:46
- Label: Vertigo; Universal
- Songwriters: Lewis Capaldi; Tobias Jesso Jr.; Tom Barnes; Pete Kelleher; Ben Kohn
- Producers: Lewis Capaldi; TMS

Lewis Capaldi singles chronology
"Pointless" (2022)	"How I'm Feeling Now" (2023)	"Wish You the Best" (2023)

Music video
- "How I'm Feeling Now" on YouTube

"How I'm Feeling Now" is a song by Scottish singer-songwriter Lewis Capaldi. It was released on 17 March 2023 through Vertigo and Universal and serves as a promotional single for his second studio album, Broken by Desire to Be Heavenly Sent, as well as his Netflix documentary, Lewis Capaldi: How I'm Feeling Now.

== Background and release ==
On 17 March 2023, a day after the trailer for Lewis Capaldi: How I'm Feeling Now was released, Capaldi released the promotional single for the documentary, titled "How I'm Feeling Now". The song talks about Capaldi's struggles with mental health and the life-changing effects of fame. On social media, Capaldi says, "It’s the last song I wrote for [Broken by Desire to Be Heavenly Sent]," and that it's "all about something I’ve never really written about in my music before," referring to his mental health.

== Critical reception ==
In a review of the song, Music Talkers points out the vocal range that Capaldi starts in on the record being lower than usual, saying "it gives "How I'm Feeling Now" a fresh feel." They continue, "We know when the delivery of the song builds that Capaldi is going to give us some raw passion in the vocals, and with the topic as sensitive as this track is, we can really feel that emotion come through."

Robin Murray of Clash describes the record as "a rousing, Springsteen-esque piece of stadium bombast. That the lyrics are so carefully, explicitly hewn from his own life simply makes it all the more affecting." Kate Brayden of Hot Press says the song "gets him where he needs to be in terms of specificity and authenticity."

Kate Solomon of i says, "The song has the aura of a folk tale retooled for a Latitude headline slot but there is real feeling behind it. It ends abruptly, leaving you to wonder if Capaldi is actually OK or whether he has actually been broken by his own desire to do and be better?" The Independent's Annabel Nugent states that in the song, "Capaldi sounds most like himself, instead of a singer striving for something. It’s no coincidence that it’s also the best moment of the record." Thomas Smith of NME writes, "Moments like this – candid, coarse – are where Capaldi shows growth and where he should go next."

== Charts ==
Chart performance for "How I'm Feeling Now"
Chart (2023)	Peak position
Ireland (IRMA)	20
New Zealand (Recorded Music NZ)	10
Sweden (Sverigetopplistan)	9
UK Singles (Official Charts)	24

== Certifications ==
Certifications for "How I'm Feeling Now"
Region	Certification	Certified units/sales
United Kingdom (BPI)	Silver	200,000^{‡}
^{‡} Sales+streaming figures based on certification alone.
