= Phil Plested =

English singer and songwriter

- Born: Philip John Plested; December 8, 1992 (age 33)
- Origin: Watford, Hertfordshire, England
- Genres: Pop
- Occupations: Songwriter, Singer
- Website: plestedmusic.com

Philip John Plested is an English singer and songwriter. He has co-written songs for artists including Lewis Capaldi, the Vamps, Little Mix, Kygo, James Arthur, Anne-Marie, and Bastille.

== Early life and career ==
Plested was born in Watford, Hertfordshire, UK. He studied at Central Saint Martins in London. After leaving school in 2012, he formed a band, Chasing Grace, with his school friends. The band released their debut album Nowhere Near Old Enough in 2015, and were active until 2016. He later transitioned to becoming a songwriter. Plested made his breakthrough as a songwriter in 2016 when he co-wrote the song "Touch" for Little Mix, which peaked at No. 4 on the UK Singles Chart. In 2019, he co-wrote the song "Before You Go" for Lewis Capaldi, and it peaked at number one on the UK Singles Chart as well as on Billboard's Mainstream Top 40 and Adult Top 40.

As a solo artist, Plested released his debut album First & Foremost in 2018 with Atlantic Records.

== Discography ==
=== Albums ===
- First & Foremost (2018)

=== As songwriter ===
Year	Title	Artist	Album
2026	"Heroine"	Maroon 5	Non-album single
2023	Gone	Lost Frequencies & Alexander Stewart	All Stand Together
2023	Back Home For Christmas	Mimi Webb	Non-album singles
2023	Leftover Love	Picture This	Non-album singles
2023	Home Is Where The Heart Is	LANY	A Beautiful Blur
2023	Both	Tiësto & Bia	Non-album singles
2023	Goodbye Never Felt So Bad	James Bay	Non-album singles
2023	Trainwreck	Anne-Marie	Unhelathy
2023	Duvet Cover	Ashley Singh	Non-album single
2023	Must Be Love	Niall Horan	The Show
2023	The Pretender	Lewis Capaldi	Broken by Desire to Be Heavenly Sent
2023	Love The Hell Out Of You	Lewis Capaldi	Broken by Desire to Be Heavenly Sent
2023	How This Ends	Lewis Capaldi	Broken by Desire to Be Heavenly Sent
2023	Any Kind Of Life	Lewis Capaldi	Broken by Desire to Be Heavenly Sent
2023	Dancing in a Hurricane	Freya Ridings	Blood Orange
2023	Sweet Affection	Ashley Singh	Non-album singles
2023	Not Alone	New Rules	Non-album singles
2023	Both of Us	Mimi Webb	Amelia
2023	Remind You	Mimi Webb	Amelia
2022	The Way We Were	Kygo	Thrill Of The Chase
2022	Ghost of You	Mimi Webb	Amelia
2022	Forget Me	Lewis Capaldi	Broken by Desire to be Heavenly Sent
2022	I'm Good (Blue) Ft Bebe Rexha	David Guetta	TBD
2022	Everybody Needs Someone	James Bay	Leap
2022	Shut Off The Lights	Bastille	Give Me The Future
2021	No Bad Days	Bastille	Give Me The Future
2021	Can't Say No	Wild Youth	Can't Say No
2021	Leave Before You Love Me	Marshmello & Jonas Brothers	Non-album singles
2021	Break My Heart	JC Stewart	Non-album singles
2021	Lemonade	Eves Karydas	Lemonade
2021	Falling Up	Dean Lewis	Falling Up
2021	Therapy	Anne-Marie	Therapy
2021	Our Song	Anne Marie & Niall Horan	Therapy
2020	Beautiful & Brutal	Plested	Beautiful & Brutal
2020	25 Hours	Plested	Scoob! The Album
2020	Permission	New Hope Club	New Hope Club
2020	Lose Somebody Ft One Republic	Kygo	Golden Hour
2020	Already Mine	Jasmin Abraha	Already Mine
2020	Favourite Thing	Fleur East	FEARLESS
2020	Kill Me Slow Ft MORTEN	David Guetta	New Rave
2020	Survivin'	Bastille	Give Me The Future
2019	Either You Love Me Or You Don’t - Live Acoustic	Plested	Non-album singles
2019	The Least I Could Do	Plested	Non-album singles
2019	Undo Ft Calum Scott & Shenseea	Naughty Boy	Undo
2019	Over You	Lily Moore	Over You
2019	Before You Go	Lewis Capaldi	Divinely Uninspired to a Hellish Extent
2019	Hollywood	Lewis Capaldi	Divinely Uninspired to a Hellish Extent
2019	5 Miles	James Blunt	Once Upon A Mind
2019	Nobody	James Arthur & Martin Jensen	Nobody (The Remixes)
2019	12:45 - Stripped	Etham	Stripped - EP
2019	Devil	CLC	Non-album single
2019	Proud	Aaron Carpenter	Proud
2018	Joan of Arc	Little Mix	LM5
2018	Hooked	Why Don’t We	8 Letters
2018	Say	Ruel	Ready
2018	Worthy Of You	Plested	First & Foremost
2018	Your Name	Plested	First & Foremost
2018	Habits	Plested	First & Foremost
2018	First Time	Plested	First & Foremost
2018	Ribcage	Plested	First & Foremost
2018	Backup Plan	Plested	First & Foremost
2018	Home By Now - Acoustic	Plested	First & Foremost
2018	Easier Said Than Done	Plested	First & Foremost
2018	Make A Start	Plested	Non-album singles
2018	Priorities	Plested	Non-album singles
2018	Lost For Words	Plested	Non-album singles
2018	All or Nothing Ft Ray BLK and Wyclef Jean	Naughty Boy	All or Nothing
2018	Bungee Jumping Ft Emeli Sandé and Rahat Fateh Ali Khan	Naughty Boy	Bungee Jumping
2018	Fire In Me - Sigala	John Newman	Non-album single
2018	Future	Etham	Future
2018	If Our Love Is Wrong	Calum Scott	Only Human
2018	Sore Eyes	Calum Scott	Only Human
2018	Talk About Love	Boyzone	Thank You & Goodnight
2017	Too Good To Be True Ft Machine Gun Kelly	The Vamps & Danny Avila	Night & Day
2017	Just My Type	The Vamps	Night & Day
2017	Bloodstream	The Chainsmokers	Memories...Do Not Open
2017	Remind Me To Forget Ft Miguel	Kygo	Kids in Love
2017	Last Time Love Ft Myah Marie	Fancy Cars	Last Time Love
2017	For Myself - Acoustic	Etham	For Myself - Acoustic
2016	Science	Youthonix	Science
2016	Starting Wars	Youthonix	One Beat at a Time
2016	One Beat At A Time Ft THABO	Youthonix	One Beat at a Time
2016	Ballad	PROSE	Home Of The Brave
2016	Grow On Me	PANG!	Grow On Me
2016	Touch	Little Mix	Glory Days
2016	Lazy Love	Chloe X Halle	Sugar Symphony
2015	Me & You	Sam Sure	Me & You
2013	So Strong Ft Chasing Grace	Naughty Boy	Hotel Cabana
2013	Certain Things Ft Chasing Grace	James Arthur	James Arthur
2012	A Gift & A Curse Ft Chasing Grace	Devlin	A Moving Picture

== Awards ==
Plested has won the Most Performed Pop Songs of 2021 for Before You Go by American Society of Composers, Authors and Publishers (ASCAP). He has been nominated for British Artist Video of The Year 2018 and British Single Of The Year for Touch by The Brits 2018. He has been nominated for British Album of The Year for Lewis Capaldi by The Brits 2020.
