= Strangers (Lewis Capaldi song) =

2024 single by Lewis Capaldi

Single by Lewis Capaldi

from the album Broken by Desire to Be Heavenly Sent (Expanded edition)
- Released: 5 January 2024
- Genre: Alt-pop
- Length: 3:34
- Label: Vertigo; Capitol
- Songwriters: Lewis Capaldi; Jordan K. Johnson; Michael Pollack; Stefan Johnson
- Producers: The Monsters & Strangerz; Michael Pollack

Lewis Capaldi singles chronology
"Wish You the Best" (2023)	"Strangers" (2024)	"Love the Hell Out of You" (2024)

"Strangers" is a 2024 song by Scottish singer Lewis Capaldi, released as the first single from the expanded edition of his second studio album, Broken by Desire to Be Heavenly Sent. It was released on 5 January 2024, via his record company Vertigo and Capitol Records.

== Background and recording ==
Capaldi's second studio album, Broken by Desire to Be Heavenly Sent, was released on 19 May 2023, with an extended edition being surprise-released on 1 January of the following year. Capaldi wrote "Strangers" together with songwriters Jordan K. Johnson, Michael Pollack and Stefan Johnson. Speaking about the release of the expanded edition of his second album, Capaldi posted a message on his official Instagram, saying "Prior to my decision to f— off for a bit, I’d always hoped to release an extended version at some point. After some back-and-forth about whether or not it was the right thing to do, I’ve decided it would be a shame for these five extra songs, which are so incredibly special to me, to sit on my hard drive, never to see the light of day".

Lyrically, "Strangers" appears to talk about Capaldi and "his now-gone beloved initially bonding over their shared hatred of the Oasis single “Wonderwall”, referenced through the lyrics “You say you hate this song… my dear, you’re not the only one". It has been suggested that this is in reference to a public feud between Capaldi and Liam Gallagher and Noel Gallagher.

== Release and reception ==
The song was released on 5 January 2024, as the first single from the expanded edition of Broken by Desire to Be Heavenly Sent. On 7 January 2024, it was voted favorite new music release of the past week by Billboard readers, achieving 65% of the vote from readers. Writing in Billboard, Mitchell Peters said that "Strangers" "sees him stepping back into the familiar territory of his breakthrough hit single Someone You Loved", further claiming that Capaldi appears in a " balladry mode on Strangers".

== Commercial performance ==
In the United Kingdom, "Strangers" peaked just within the Top 40 of the official UK Singles Charts, peaking at number thirty-seven and spent a total of four weeks within the Top 100 of the UK Singles Charts. In Sweden, it spent two weeks on the chart, and reached a peak of number forty-two. In Ireland, it reached number seventy on the Irish Singles Chart, whilst in Belgium it reached number forty eight, spending one week on the chart.

Whilst it did not chart within the NZ Top 40 Singles Charts in New Zealand, it did reach number twelve on the NZ Hot Singles Charts.

== Chart performance ==
Weekly chart performance for "Strangers"
Chart (2024)	Peak position
Belgium (Ultratop 50 Flanders)	48
Ireland (IRMA)	70
New Zealand Hot Singles (RMNZ)	12
San Marino (SMRRTV Top 50)	48
Slovakia Airplay (ČNS IFPI)	9
Sweden (Sverigetopplistan)	42
Switzerland (Schweizer Hitparade)	61
UK Singles (OCC)	37
