= The Day That I Die =

2025 single by Lewis Capaldi

Single by Lewis Capaldi

from the EP Survive
- Released: 14 November 2025
- Genre: Pop; pop rock
- Length: 2:55
- Label: Vertigo; Universal
- Songwriters: Lewis Capaldi; Amy Allen; Tobias Jesso Jr.; John Ryan
- Producer: Edd Holloway

Lewis Capaldi singles chronology
"Almost" (2025)	"The Day That I Die" (2025)	"Stay Love" (2026)

"The Day That I Die" is a song by Scottish singer-songwriter Lewis Capaldi, released on 14 November 2025 through Vertigo and Universal as the fourth and final single from Capaldi's third extended play Survive, which was released the same day.

== Background ==
"The Day That I Die" is the fourth and final track on Capaldi's Survive EP, and is the fourth song released since his comeback. Talking about the song on Instagram, Capaldi states that it's about "the lowest I’ve felt in my life" and that "it feels a bit weird putting it out there for people to hear but I’m honestly the proudest I’ve ever been about a song with this one."

== Critical reception ==
Shiga Miyato writing for Stanisland Magazine states, "Capaldi’s music often resonates with people who share the same experiences, and this time is no exception." Miyato then describes the song as "a brooding, melancholic atmosphere". Jo Forrest of TotalNtertainment says, "Raw, cathartic, and unflinchingly honest, ‘The Day That I Die’ stands tall among Capaldi’s catalogue of emotional anthems, once again showcasing his extraordinary gift for finding truth and beauty in life’s most painful moments."

== Charts ==
Chart performance for "The Day That I Die"
Chart (2025)	Peak position
Ireland (IRMA)	80
Belgium (Ultratop 50 Flanders)	33
UK Singles (OCC)	27
