= Survive (Lewis Capaldi song) =

2025 single by Lewis Capaldi

Single by Lewis Capaldi

from the EP Survive
- Released: 27 June 2025
- Genre: Pop
- Length: 3:44
- Label: Vertigo; Universal
- Songwriters: Lewis Capaldi; Rømans
- Producers: Peter Fenn; Rømans; Andrew Wells; Connor McDonough; Riley McDonough

Lewis Capaldi singles chronology
| "Love the Hell Out of You" (2024) | "Survive" (2025) | "Something in the Heavens" (2025) |

Music video
- "Survive" on YouTube

"Survive" is a song by Scottish singer-songwriter Lewis Capaldi, released on 27 June 2025 through Vertigo and Universal. Following Capaldi's performance at Glastonbury 2025, "Survive" entered at the top of the UK Singles Chart. Outside the United Kingdom, "Survive" peaked within the top ten of the charts in Ireland. "Survive" is the lead single from Capaldi's third extended play of the same name.

== Background and release ==
"Survive" was written by Capaldi and Rømans, who also co-wrote Capaldi's smash hit, "Someone You Loved". The song marks Capaldi's first single in two years, in which he took a hiatus from touring and performing, starting in June 2023, stating that he needed to focus on his mental and physical health as well as the impact of his Tourette's syndrome. Earlier that month, Capaldi performed at the 2023 Glastonbury Festival, but his set was cut short by an episode of his Tourette's and vocal issues, though the crowd continued singing to help him finish the performance.

Two years later, rumours speculated that Capaldi would be performing a surprise set at the 2025 Glastonbury Festival and releasing a new single on 27 June 2025. That day, he released his comeback single, "Survive", which happened to occur on the same day as his predicted surprise performance at the 2025 Glastonbury Festival, his first high-profile performance in two years. On stage at Glastonbury, Capaldi said, "The last two years haven't been the best for me. It's been difficult at times. I wanted to write a song that was about overcoming that stuff and getting over the other side of it. It has been my goal to get back [on stage], and "Survive" is a song about that."

== Music video ==
The music video was directed by Hector Docktrill, who also directed the music video for Capaldi's 2022 single, "Pointless". It features Capaldi sitting on a chair in the middle of a room, strumming his guitar and singing. Throughout the music video, clips of documental moments of Capaldi's life pop up, ranging from his childhood to the few months before his health-related hiatus, where he was struggling with his Tourette's and anxiety.

== Critical reception ==
Isabella Wandermurem of Euphoria says Capaldi "isn't just releasing new music — he's offering a piece of himself, marked by scars but also by stubborn hope. It's not just a song for those who have struggled; it's a song by someone who has, and who still is. And that makes all the difference."

C. Sharmishtha of The Indiependent says the song "is yet another compelling addition to Lewis Capaldi's discography. It's a testament to his enduring appeal – a song that is both a cathartic release and a comforting embrace for anyone navigating their own struggles."

Britt Mae of Melodic Magazine says, "After weathering a severe emotional storm, Capaldi begins a new era with a renewed sense of purpose. "Survive" proves that even in the darkest moments, there's still strength in showing up."

== Commercial performance ==
In the mid-week singles charts update in the United Kingdom (on 30 June 2025), "Survive" debuted at number one on the charts update. On 4 July 2025, "Survive" entered at the top of the UK Singles Chart, dethroning "Manchild" by Sabrina Carpenter from the summit of the chart.

== Charts ==
=== Weekly charts ===
Weekly chart performance for "Survive"
| Chart (2025–2026) | Peak position |
|---|---|
| Australia (ARIA) | 71 |
| Austria Airplay (IFPI) | 2 |
| Belgium (Ultratop 50 Flanders) | 30 |
| Canada Hot 100 (Billboard) | 92 |
| Canada Hot AC (Billboard) | 29 |
| Colombia Anglo Airplay (Monitor Latino) | 13 |
| Croatia International Airplay (Top lista) | 5 |
| Czech Republic Airplay (ČNS IFPI) | 2 |
| Denmark Airplay (Tracklisten) | 2 |
| Ecuador Anglo Airplay (Monitor Latino) | 11 |
| Estonia Airplay (TopHit) | 18 |
| Finland Airplay (Radiosoittolista) | 16 |
| Global 200 (Billboard) | 110 |
| Guatemala Anglo Airplay (Monitor Latino) | 9 |
| Iceland (Tónlistinn) | 21 |
| Ireland (IRMA) | 4 |
| Japan Hot Overseas (Billboard Japan) | 12 |
| Latvia Airplay (LaIPA) | 9 |
| Lebanon (Lebanese Top 20) | 8 |
| Lithuania Airplay (TopHit) | 21 |
| Malta Airplay (Radiomonitor) | 1 |
| Mexico Anglo Airplay (Monitor Latino) | 11 |
| Netherlands (Dutch Top 40) | 20 |
| Netherlands (Single Top 100) | 77 |
| New Zealand Hot Singles (RMNZ) | 8 |
| Nicaragua Anglo Airplay (Monitor Latino) | 6 |
| Nigeria (TurnTable Top 100) | 84 |
| Norway (IFPI Norge) | 72 |
| Portugal Airplay (AFP) | 6 |
| Romania Airplay (TopHit) | 45 |
| San Marino Airplay (SMRTV Top 50) | 21 |
| Slovakia Airplay (ČNS IFPI) | 34 |
| Sweden Heatseeker (Sverigetopplistan) | 4 |
| Switzerland (Schweizer Hitparade) | 17 |
| Switzerland Airplay (IFPI) | 1 |
| UK Singles (Official Charts) | 1 |
| US Adult Contemporary (Billboard) | 28 |
| US Adult Pop Airplay (Billboard) | 10 |
| US Digital Song Sales (Billboard) | 8 |
| US Pop Airplay (Billboard) | 31 |

=== Monthly charts ===
Monthly chart performance for "Survive"
| Chart (2025) | Peak position |
|---|---|
| Estonia Airplay (TopHit) | 33 |
| Lithuania Airplay (TopHit) | 25 |
| Romania Airplay (TopHit) | 54 |

=== Year-end charts ===
Year-end chart performance for "Survive"
| Chart (2025) | Position |
|---|---|
| Belgium (Ultratop 50 Flanders) | 108 |
| Canada Hot AC (Billboard) | 82 |
| Estonia Airplay (TopHit) | 70 |
| Iceland (Tónlistinn) | 65 |
| Netherlands (Dutch Top 40) | 91 |
| US Adult Pop Airplay (Billboard) | 40 |

== Certifications ==
Certifications for "Survive"
| Region | Certification | Certified units/sales |
|---|---|---|
| United Kingdom (BPI) | Gold | 400,000^{‡} |
^{‡} Sales+streaming figures based on certification alone.

== Release history ==
Release history for "Survive"
| Region | Date | Format(s) | Label(s) | Ref. |
|---|---|---|---|---|
| Various | 27 June 2025 | Digital download; streaming | Vertigo; Universal | |
| United States | 15 July 2025 | Contemporary hit radio | Capitol | |
