= Broken by Desire to Be Heavenly Sent =

- Standard version cover

Studio album by Lewis Capaldi
- Released: 19 May 2023
- Recorded: 2021–2023
- Genre: Pop
- Length: 43:10
- Labels: Vertigo; Capitol
- Producers: Edd Holloway; Fat Max Gsus; Lewis Capaldi; Max Martin; Nick Atkinson; Robert John "Mutt" Lange; Steve Mac; TMS

Lewis Capaldi chronology
Divinely Uninspired to a Hellish Extent (2019)	Broken by Desire to Be Heavenly Sent (2023)	Survive (2025)

Singles from Broken by Desire to Be Heavenly Sent
- 1. "Forget Me" Released: 9 September 2022; 2. "Pointless" Released: 2 December 2022; 3. "Wish You the Best" Released: 13 April 2023

Broken by Desire to Be Heavenly Sent is the second studio album by Scottish singer-songwriter Lewis Capaldi, released on 19 May 2023 through Vertigo Records and Capitol Records. It was preceded by three singles—the UK number ones "Forget Me", "Pointless" and "Wish You the Best", as well as the promotional single "How I'm Feeling Now"—and promoted with a 2023 world tour as well as a Netflix documentary titled Lewis Capaldi: How I'm Feeling Now.

The album received generally positive reviews from critics and debuted atop the charts in the UK—where it became the fastest-selling album of 2023—as well as Australia, the Netherlands, Ireland and New Zealand.

== Background and recording ==
Capaldi stated that his inspiration for writing the album was "go[ing] out and look[ing] out at the world and what's shit, and then [he] would write songs pertaining to that". In a press release at the time of the lead single "Forget Me", Capaldi explained that he did not want to make a "new sound" for nor "reinvent" himself, and that "The songs [he] want[s] to write are emotional songs, about love or loss".

The album was recorded with a simple set-up, "only a small interface, laptop, speakers, and a Shure SM7B vocal mic", and songwriters and producers who worked on Capaldi's first album—TMS, Phil Plested, Nick Atkinson and Edd Holloway—with Capaldi stating "at least one of them's on almost every song". Capaldi commented that he "felt like [he] was sounding better because [he] was just chilled out in [his] own gaff".

The album was released on 19 May 2023, with an extended edition being surprise-released on 1 January of the following year.

== Promotion ==
The album was announced on 18 October 2022, following the September release of the lead single "Forget Me", which debuted at number one on the UK Singles Chart. It was followed by the second single, "Pointless", on 2 December 2022, which reached number one on the UK Singles Chart the following month.

A trailer for Capaldi's Netflix documentary Lewis Capaldi: How I'm Feeling Now, was released on 16 March 2023, followed by the promotional single "How I'm Feeling Now" a day later. The documentary premiered on 5 April. The third single, "Wish You the Best", was issued on 13 April 2023 and debuted at number one in the UK the following week.

In August 2024, the album track "Love the Hell Out of You" resurged in popularity over a year after its original release after its feature in the film It Ends with Us. As a result, the song was retitled "Love the Hell Out of You (From the Motion Picture 'It Ends with Us')" on streaming and digital platforms. The song was also released as a single, and an extended play featuring the original version of the song, along with piano acoustic, guitar acoustic and string versions of the song, was released on the same day as the film, on 9 August 2024. By 25 August 2025, the song was retitled back to "Love the Hell Out of You" on streaming and digital platforms.

== Critical reception ==
Professional ratings
Aggregate scores
Source	Rating
AnyDecentMusic?	5.9/10
Metacritic	61/100
Review scores
Source	Rating
Clash	6/10
Evening Standard	4/5 stars
The Guardian	3/5 stars
Hot Press	6/10
i	3/5 stars
The Independent	3/5 stars
The Line of Best Fit	8/10
NME	3/5 stars
Pitchfork	4.0/10
Rolling Stone UK	3/5 stars

Broken by Desire to Be Heavenly Sent received a score of 61 out of 100 based on eight critics' reviews at review aggregator Metacritic, indicating "generally favourable" reception. Alexis Petridis of The Guardian felt that Capaldi has "a powerful voice" and that he is "better at misery than soaring happiness" but that "there are moments where the Hey Jude-by-way-of-Coldplay piano intros and wounded, roaring choruses merge into one long heartbroken ballad – and occasionally points up his limitations". Kate Brayden of Hot Press wrote that the album "sticks largely to familiar terrain, but emphasises the talent's jaw-dropping vocal prowess on numerous tracks", particularly "Any Kind of Life" and "How This Ends". Brayden also felt that the "gargantuan weight of expectations" affects the music, as the "results" of Capaldi's writing sessions with London- and Los Angeles-based songwriters "are mixed, with a boatload of raw piano ballads referencing original sin, angels, hell, heaven, undying love and the rest". Reviewing the album for The Line of Best Fit, Caitlin Chatterton described the album as "a triumphant return from Capaldi", calling "Heavenly Kind of State of Mind" one of its best tracks as it "encourages listeners to put down the tissues and stand up for a boogie", and "Love the Hell Out of You" and "Any Kind of Life" as "tender piano ballads [that] relish, and then anguish over the 'during' and 'after' of falling in love".

Robin Murray of Clash wrote that on the album, Capaldi "plays it safe, doubling down on the formula that made his debut so beloved by fans, while making only subtle changes" and with a "lack of daring" it "certainly delivers on fan-pleasing trickery". Murray concluded that it "feels slightly too close to his debut to be truly considered a further chapter". Reviewing the album for NME, Thomas Smith opined that the album "occasionally shows steady growth" as with the groove on "Forget Me", the "tinge" of Americana on "Heavenly Kind of State of Mind", the "'80s power ballad-indebted" guitar solo on "Leave Me Slowly", as well as Capaldi's irony and "candid" lyrics on "How I'm Feeling Now", but that "this potential remains largely untapped". David Smyth of the Evening Standard noted that "although these songs do nothing new – the back-and-forth piano notes of Wish You the Best, Haven't You Ever Been in Love Before and Any Kind of Life all strongly recalling his huge hit Someone You Loved – any cynicism is undetectable".

Kate Solomon of i found the music to be "inoffensive and unremarkable" but that Capaldi's "true talent is his relatable lyrics" and that she "found this album moving – when it wasn't trying too hard to be sweet". The Independent's Annabel Nugent judged that "these gorgeously sung laments turn into a ballad soup of sorts", and that the album lacks Capaldi's "personable charm" and "variety". Nugent felt that the album's "best moment" is the closing track, "How I'm Feeling Now", on which Capaldi "sounds most like himself, instead of a singer striving for something". Reviewing the album for Pitchfork, Laura Snapes wrote that the album as a whole is "unlistenable" as it feels "like watching a play in which every scene is acted as if it were the emotional climax", explaining that "nearly every song starts gently, with Capaldi's voice in its appealing conversational mode—a little boyish and uncertain, as if trying to reach someone—before a chorus smashes in like a wrecking ball". She also felt that the "ceaselessly wet, antiseptic piano proves entirely the wrong foil for a voice forever on the cusp of unraveling".

Neil McCormick of The Telegraph described the album as "absolutely stuffed to the rafters with another round of big, weepie ballads about how miserable [Capaldi's] love life is", and stated that he "can't help but like Capaldi, even while [he] question[s] whether anyone really needs to hear twelve melodramatic weepies in a row". Nick Reilly of Rolling Stone UK wrote that, "In leaning too heavily on the balladeering side of things to deliver a sure-fire hit, Capaldi risks neglecting the subtle moments of experimentation on show that hint at an altogether more exciting future" and "a more varied and interesting musical future could still be his. You just wish he'd dare to try that route." Ben Devlin from musicOMH called the album "sonically and thematically repetitive" and wrote that the lack of Capaldi's sense of humour in his music is "a failure of imagination, and the weaker points on [the album] are unfortunately testaments to that unimaginative approach".

== Commercial performance ==
Broken by Desire to Be Heavenly Sent debuted at number one on the UK Albums Chart dated 26 May 2023, outselling the rest of the top 10 combined, with 95,000 chart sales, making it the fastest selling album of the year in the UK and the largest opening week of Capaldi's career. The album debuted at number one in Australia, becoming Capaldi's first number-one album there.

== Track listing ==
Broken by Desire to Be Heavenly Sent track listing
No.	Title	Writer(s)	Producer(s)	Length
1.	"Forget Me"	Lewis Capaldi; Michael Pollack; Philip Plested; Thomas Barnes; Peter Kelleher; Benjamin Kohn	TMS; Capaldi; Chris Bishop^{[a]}	3:23
2.	"Wish You the Best"	Capaldi; JP Saxe; Malay	TMS; Capaldi; Bishop^{[a]}	3:30
3.	"Pointless"	Capaldi; Johnny McDaid; Steve Mac; Ed Sheeran	Mac	3:51
4.	"Heavenly Kind of State of Mind"	Capaldi; Jamie Hartman; Nick Atkinson	Capaldi; Atkinson; Edd Holloway	3:21
5.	"Haven't You Ever Been in Love Before?"	Capaldi; Atkinson; Holloway	Capaldi; Atkinson; Holloway	3:50
6.	"Love the Hell Out of You"	Capaldi; Pollack; Plested; Barnes; Kelleher; Kohn	Capaldi; TMS; Bishop^{[a]}	3:25
7.	"Burning"	Capaldi; Atkinson; Holloway	Capaldi; Atkinson; Holloway; Bishop^{[a]}	3:36
8.	"Any Kind of Life"	Capaldi; Plested; Barnes; Kelleher; Kohn	Capaldi; TMS; Bishop^{[a]}	3:15
9.	"The Pretender"	Capaldi; Plested; Atkinson; Holloway	Capaldi; Atkinson; Holloway	3:40
10.	"Leave Me Slowly"	Capaldi; Savan Kotecha; Max Martin; Oscar Holter; Max Grahn	Martin; Fat Max Gsus; Robert John Lange	3:43
11.	"How This Ends"	Capaldi; Pollack; Plested; Barnes; Kelleher; Kohn	Capaldi; Atkinson; Holloway	3:46
12.	"How I'm Feeling Now"	Capaldi; Barnes; Kelleher; Kohn; Tobias Jesso Jr.	TMS; Capaldi; Bishop^{[a]}	3:46
Total length:				43:10

Japanese bonus tracks
No.	Title	Length
13.	"Pointless" (unplugged)	4:30
14.	"Wish You the Best" (acoustic)	3:48
Total length:		51:32

Apple Music bonus tracks
No.	Title	Length
13.	"How I'm Feeling Now" (orchestral version)	3:45
14.	"Burning" (orchestral version)	3:34
Total length:		50:29

Extended edition
No.	Title	Writer(s)	Producer(s)	Length
15.	"Strangers"	Capaldi; Pollack; Stefan Johnson; Jordan Johnson	Pollack; The Monsters & Strangerz	3:34
16.	"A Cure for Minds Unwell"	Capaldi; Atkinson; Barnes; Kelleher; Kohn	TMS	3:24
17.	"Someone I Could Die For"	Capaldi; Plested; Pollack; Barnes; Kelleher; Kohn	TMS	3:26
18.	"The Ancient Art of Always Fucking Up"	Capaldi; McDaid; Barnes; Kelleher; Kohn	TMS; McDaid; PARISI	4:03
19.	"Old Navy Blue"	Capaldi; Thomas Hull	Kid Harpoon	3:08
Total length:				68:04

Note

- ^{^[a]} signifies an additional producer

== Personnel ==
Musicians

- Lewis Capaldi – vocals (all tracks), guitar (tracks 1, 3, 11, 12), background vocals (2, 4, 5, 7, 9, 11, 12), synthesizer (4), piano (5)
- Benjamin Kohn – background vocals (1, 6, 8), synthesizer (1), organ (2), keyboards (6), shaker (12)
- Nick Atkinson – background vocals (1, 4, 5, 7–9, 11)
- John Garrison – bass guitar (1)
- Jonathan Gilmore – drum programming (1, 11), programming (1)
- Freddy Sheed – drums (1, 11)
- Tom Barnes – drums (1, 12), synthesizer (2), drum programming (6), piano (8)
- Leo Abrahams – guitar (1)
- Philip Plested – guitar (1, 6), background vocals (6, 11)
- Vern Asbury – guitar (1, 7, 8)
- Peter Kelleher – keyboards (1), bass guitar (2, 6, 8, 12)
- Michael Pollack – piano (1, 6)
- Neil Cowley – piano (2)
- Dave Eggar – double bass, cello, viola, string arrangement (3, 8, 12)
- Phil Faconti – double bass (3, 8, 12)
- Chuck Palmer – string arrangement (3, 8, 12)
- Tanner Perry – string arrangement (3, 8, 12)
- Diego Núñez – violin (3, 8)
- Jessica Ryou – violin (3, 8)
- Xavi Morató – violin (3, 8)
- Steve Pearce – bass guitar (3)
- Chris Laws – drums (3)
- John Paricelli – guitar (3)
- Edd Holloway – bass guitar, drum programming (4, 5, 7, 9, 11); synthesizer (4, 5, 7), piano (4, 7, 9), guitar (5, 9), background vocals (7), strings (9), keyboards (11)
- Jamie Hartman – guitar (4)
- Jerry McPherson – guitar (4)
- Aiden Halliday – piano (5)
- Wired Strings (Note: Wired Strings consists of arranger and cellist Rosie Danvers, cellist Jane Oliver, double bassist Richard Pryce, violists Meghan Cassidy and Nick Barr, and violinists Charis Jenson, Ellie Stanford, Hayley Pomfrett, Natalie Klouda, Patrick Kiernan, Sally Jackson, Steve Morris, and Zara Benyounes.) – strings (5)
- The LJ Singers (Note: The LJ Singers consists of Lawrence Johnson, Brendan Guyatt, Candice Johnson, Lorrain Briscoe, Nia Johnson, Nyasha Mutsonziwa, Patrice Copeland, Patricia Scott, Priscilla Jones-Campbell, Tehillah Daniel, Travis Cole, Wayne Hernandez, and Wendy Rose.) – choir (6, 8)
- Lawrence Johnson – vocal arrangement (6, 8)
- Fat Max Gsus – background vocals, bass guitar, drums, guitar, keyboards, programming (10)
- Max Martin – background vocals, piano, programming (10)
- Oscar Holter – bass guitar, drums, keyboards, programming (10)
- Robert John "Mutt" Lange – background vocals (10)

Technical

- Robert Vosgien – mastering
- Mark "Spike" Stent – mixing
- Chris Laws – engineering (3)
- Dan Pursey – engineering (3)
- Jonathan Gilmore – engineering (11)
- Chris Bishop – vocal engineering (1, 8, 12), additional engineering (1, 2, 6, 12)
- Matt Barnes – vocal engineering (2)
- Edd Holloway – vocal engineering (3)
- Mike Stephenson – additional engineering (3, 8, 12)
- Tanner Perry – additional engineering (3, 8, 12)
- The LJ Singers – additional engineering (6)
- Matt Wolach – mixing assistance

== Charts ==
=== Weekly charts ===
Weekly chart performance for Broken by Desire to Be Heavenly Sent
Chart (2023)	Peak position
Australian Albums (ARIA)	1
Austrian Albums (Ö3 Austria)	7
Belgian Albums (Ultratop Flanders)	2
Belgian Albums (Ultratop Wallonia)	6
Canadian Albums (Billboard)	2
Danish Albums (Hitlisten)	10
Dutch Albums (Album Top 100)	1
Finnish Albums (Suomen virallinen lista)	35
French Albums (SNEP)	41
German Albums (Offizielle Top 100)	4
Irish Albums (Official Charts)	1
Italian Albums (FIMI)	31
Lithuanian Albums (AGATA)	88
New Zealand Albums (RMNZ)	1
Norwegian Albums (VG-lista)	2
Polish Albums (ZPAV)	61
Portuguese Albums (AFP)	14
Scottish Albums (Official Charts)	1
Spanish Albums (Promusicae)	30
Swedish Albums (Sverigetopplistan)	21
Swiss Albums (Schweizer Hitparade)	2
UK Albums (Official Charts)	1
US Billboard 200	14

=== Year-end charts ===
2023 year-end chart performance for Broken by Desire to Be Heavenly Sent
Chart (2023)	Position
Belgian Albums (Ultratop Flanders)	84
Dutch Albums (Album Top 100)	45
Swiss Albums (Schweizer Hitparade)	98
UK Albums (OCC)	14

2024 year-end chart performance for Broken by Desire to Be Heavenly Sent
Chart (2024)	Position
Belgian Albums (Ultratop Flanders)	142
UK Albums (OCC)	77

== Certifications ==
Certifications for Broken by Desire to Be Heavenly Sent
Region	Certification	Certified units/sales
Belgium (BRMA)	Platinum	20,000^{‡}
Denmark (IFPI Danmark)	Platinum	20,000^{‡}
New Zealand (RMNZ)	Platinum	15,000^{‡}
United Kingdom (BPI)	Platinum	300,000^{‡}
^{‡} Sales+streaming figures based on certification alone.

== Release history ==
Release history and formats for Broken by Desire to Be Heavenly Sent
Region	Date	Format(s)	Label	Version	Ref.
Various	19 May 2023	Cassette; CD; digital download; streaming; vinyl	Vertigo; Capitol	Standard edition	
Various	1 January 2024	digital download; streaming	Vertigo; Capitol	Extended edition	
