= Survive (Lewis Capaldi EP) =

EP by Lewis Capaldi
- Released: 14 November 2025
- Genre: Pop
- Length: 13:37
- Label: Vertigo; Capitol; Universal
- Producer: Andrew Wells; Edd Holloway; Connor McDonough; Riley McDonough; Michael Pollack; The Monsters & Strangerz; Rømans; Todd Clark

Lewis Capaldi chronology
| Broken by Desire to Be Heavenly Sent (2023) | Survive (2025) |

Singles from Survive
- 1. "Survive" Released: 27 June 2025; 2. "Something in the Heavens" Released: 18 September 2025; 3. "Almost" Released: 24 October 2025; 4. "The Day That I Die" Released: 14 November 2025; 5. "Stay Love" Released: 17 April 2026

Survive is the third extended play by Scottish singer-songwriter Lewis Capaldi, released on 14 November 2025 through Vertigo, Capitol, and Universal. All four tracks were released as singles. A reissued version of the EP was released on 17 April 2026 along with a bonus single, "Stay Love".

== Critical reception ==
Professional ratings
Review scores
| Source | Rating |
|---|---|
| The Scotsman | 3/5 stars |

Writing for The Scotsman, Fiona Shepherd admits, "The songs on this EP may not represent a dramatic new departure for Lewis Capaldi, but given the mental health struggles he’s been dealing with it’s encouraging that he has embraced his return so fully", and lauds Capaldi as "he has proven himself willing to be open and vulnerable in person and in song and has testified to emerging stronger for it."

Rolling Stone UK calls the EP "a snapshot of his time away from music to focus on his mental health and offers searing clarity into the reality of the situation", and also praises Capaldi, declaring "he’s come out the other end with a collection of songs that rank among his very best." Gabi Cuevas of Melodic Magazine says Capaldi "has, once again, delivered a soulful project with four (Note: Written prior to the reissue) songs that the audience will be able to relate to."

== Track listing ==
Survive – Standard edition
| No. | Title | Length |
|---|---|---|
| 1. | "Survive" | 3:44 |
| 2. | "Something in the Heavens" | 3:18 |
| 3. | "Almost" | 3:40 |
| 4. | "The Day That I Die" | 2:54 |
| Total length: | | 13:37 |

Survive – Reissue edition (bonus track)
| No. | Title | Length |
|---|---|---|
| 5. | "Stay Love" | 3:26 |
| Total length: | | 17:03 |

== Release history ==
Release history for Survive
| Region | Date | Format(s) | Label(s) | Ref. |
|---|---|---|---|---|
| Various | 14 November 2025 | Digital download; streaming; vinyl; CD | Vertigo; Universal | |
| Various | 17 April 2026 (reissue) | Digital download; streaming | Vertigo; Universal | |
