= Stay Love =

2026 single by Lewis Capaldi

Single by Lewis Capaldi

from the EP Survive
- Released: 17 April 2026
- Genre: Pop
- Length: 3:26
- Label: Vertigo; Universal
- Songwriters: Lewis Capaldi; Michael Pollack; Stefan Johnson; Jordan K. Johnson
- Producers: The Monsters & Strangerz; Michael Pollack

Lewis Capaldi singles chronology
| "The Day That I Die" (2025) | "Stay Love" (2026) |

Music video
- "Stay Love" on YouTube

"Stay Love" is a song by Scottish singer-songwriter Lewis Capaldi, released on 17 April 2026 through Vertigo and Universal. It serves as a bonus single on the reissued version of Capaldi's third extended play, Survive.

== Background and release ==
On 14 April 2026, reports were made about mysterious vinyls that were being sold in record stores across the United States and the United Kingdom, including Rough Trade Records, with the cover being a plain white sleeve, and having nothing printed on the record itself revealing the artist. When played, a pitched-down piano-based ballad played, with the vocals also pitched down to disguise the singer's voice. Many record store employees described it as a "sneak preview" of a new song from "a major artist" that was set to be released soon.

A day later, on 15 April, Capaldi revealed himself to be the artist behind the mystery vinyls, by posting a video of him on social media lip-syncing to the song's original studio recording. The song's title was later revealed as "Stay Love", and Capaldi debuted the song live during his show at Madison Square Garden in New York City on 16 April 2026, before its official release a day later, on 17 April 2026. The single was released as a bonus single on the reissued version of Capaldi's third EP, Survive, which was released the same day.

The meaning behind "Stay Love" is described as "a deeply personal plea for emotional support and commitment in the face of vulnerability, mental struggle, and the fear of abandonment."

== Critical reception ==
Sophie Graham of Music and Gigs believes the additional song on the EP "fits perfectly into a body of work that is quietly becoming one of the most emotionally coherent things he's ever made."

Madi Briggs of Music is to Blame describes the song as follows: "Starting off slowly with its melodic piano lines before crescendoing into a complete spiral of emotions before gently coming back down", and states that due to this style, "it’s understandable why the single has already received critical acclaim", and declares that "Stay Love" "marks itself as Capaldi’s biggest single as of yet."

Jo Forrest of TotalNtertainment says the single "finds Capaldi at his most vulnerable, pairing his unmistakably rich voice with a stripped-back arrangement that allows every lyric to resonate", and states, "Infused with hope, the track leans into the quiet intensity that has become a hallmark of Capaldi’s artistry, delivering a powerful performance that underscores both fragility and resolve."

== Charts ==
Chart performance for "Stay Love"
| Chart (2026) | Peak position |
|---|---|
| Czech Republic Airplay (ČNS IFPI) | 3 |
| Ireland (IRMA) | 93 |
| Malta Airplay (Radiomonitor) | 17 |
| New Zealand Hot Singles (RMNZ) | 9 |
| Portugal Airplay (AFP) | 3 |
| UK Singles (Official Charts) | 68 |

== Release history ==
Release dates and formats for "Stay Love"
| Region | Date | Format | Label | Ref. |
|---|---|---|---|---|
| Various | April 17, 2026 | Digital download; streaming | Vertigo; Universal | |
| United Kingdom | April 17, 2026 | Radio airplay | Universal | |
