= Almost (Lewis Capaldi song) =

2025 single by Lewis Capaldi

Single by Lewis Capaldi

from the EP Survive
- Released: 24 October 2025
- Genre: Pop rock; alternative rock
- Length: 3:41
- Label: Vertigo; Universal
- Songwriters: Lewis Capaldi; Aiden Halliday; Ines Dunn; Todd Clark
- Producer: Todd Clark

Lewis Capaldi singles chronology
"Something in the Heavens" (2025)	"Almost" (2025)	"The Day That I Die" (2025)

"Almost" is a song by Scottish singer-songwriter Lewis Capaldi, released on 24 October 2025 through Vertigo and Universal as the third single from Capaldi's third extended play Survive.

== Background ==
According to a statement about the single, the song is described as "raw and intimate exploration of what it means to move on – or at least try to. Honest and understated, the song captures the struggle to let go."

== Critical reception ==
Kate Jeffrie of Clash states, "The song meditates on the struggles of moving on – hyper personal and always nuanced, as the best of Capaldi is – but bleeds into the universal, a heartbreak track that could fill a stadium with those that know the feeling." Music Talkers said, "There’s a rare kind of honesty in the way Lewis writes — he doesn’t just sing about heartbreak, he translates it. You don’t just hear his pain, you recognize your own somewhere inside it."

== Charts ==
=== Weekly charts ===
Weekly chart performance
Chart (2025–2026)	Peak position
Croatia International Airplay (Top lista)	63
Germany Airplay (BVMI)	46
Guatemala Anglo Airplay (Monitor Latino)	12
Ireland (IRMA)	66
Lithuania Airplay (TopHit)	30
New Zealand Hot Singles (RMNZ)	16
Portugal Airplay (AFP)	25
Switzerland Airplay (IFPI)	7
UK Singles (OCC)	44

=== Monthly charts ===
Monthly chart performance
Chart (2026)	Peak position
Lithuania Airplay (TopHit)	69

== Release history ==
Release history for "Almost"
Region	Date	Format(s)	Label(s)	Ref.
Various	24 October 2025	Digital download; streaming	Vertigo; Universal	
