= Something in the Heavens =

2025 single by Lewis Capaldi

Single by Lewis Capaldi

from the EP Survive
- Released: 18 September 2025
- Genre: Pop
- Length: 3:18
- Label: Vertigo; Universal
- Songwriters: Lewis Capaldi; Connor McDonough; Riley McDonough
- Producers: Connor McDonough; Riley McDonough; Luke Glazewski

Lewis Capaldi singles chronology
"Survive" (2025)	"Something in the Heavens" (2025)	"Almost" (2025)

"Something in the Heavens" is a song by Scottish singer-songwriter Lewis Capaldi, released on 18 September 2025 through Vertigo and Universal as the second single from his third extended play Survive.

== Background and release ==
"Something in the Heavens" is the second single following Capaldi's comeback in June 2025, when he released the single "Survive" and went on to play a surprise set on the Pyramid Stage at Glastonbury Festival 2025. On 2 July 2025, a demo of the song was released under the title "Sounds Of Gathering Clouds" from the CD Lyrics of "Survive". The song was later titled as "Something In The Heavens" and was reportedly planned to be released on 14 August 2025, but it was later delayed.

On 3 September 2025, some of Capaldi's fans received a bouquet of flowers in the mail, alongside a signed card with the lyric "'Something in the Heavens' tells me that we'll be together again," handwritten on the front. When opened, a short snippet of the song plays. Scottish singer Susan Boyle, with whom Capaldi has developed a friendship, also received a bouquet. The following day, Capaldi publicly teased the song for the first time by posting an extended version of the previous snippet to social media.

The song debuted live on 6 September 2025, during the opening show of Capaldi's Summer 2025 UK & Ireland tour, in Sheffield. On 15 September 2025, Capaldi announced via social media that "Something in the Heavens" would release just three days later, on 18 September 2025. The song's meaning revolves around a love that persists after loss, a promise to hold on until the next life, and the imagery of heaven as reunion.

== Critical reception ==
Sophie Graham of Music and Gigs describes "Something in the Heavens" as "raw, heartfelt, and quintessentially Capaldi, proving once again he knows how to make a song feel like it’s just for you." Music Talkers says the song "doesn’t reinvent Capaldi’s wheel—but it doesn’t need to." They state further, "It’s a subtle evolution of his trademark balladry—less polished pop sheen, more atmospheric folk-soul."

Universal Music Canada said, "'Something In The Heavens' details loss in all its forms - but also the glimmers of hope that remain - and is yet another breathtaking example of Lewis’s extraordinary gift for cutting straight to the soul."

== Charts ==
=== Weekly charts ===
Chart performance
Chart (2025)	Peak position
Croatia International Airplay (Top lista)	10
Ireland (IRMA)	13
Latvia Airplay (LaIPA)	13
Lithuania Airplay (TopHit)	40
Netherlands (Single Tip)	5
New Zealand Hot Singles (RMNZ)	2
Norway (IFPI Norge)	51
Slovakia Airplay (ČNS IFPI)	42
Sweden (Sverigetopplistan)	89
Switzerland (Schweizer Hitparade)	86
UK Singles (OCC)	3

=== Monthly charts ===
Monthly chart performance
Chart (2025)	Peak position
Lithuania Airplay (TopHit)	46

== Certifications ==
Certifications for "Something in the Heavens"
Region	Certification	Certified units/sales
United Kingdom (BPI)	Silver	200,000^{‡}
^{‡} Sales+streaming figures based on certification alone.

== Release history ==
Release history for "Something in the Heavens"
Region	Date	Format(s)	Label(s)	Ref.
Various	18 September 2025	Digital download; streaming	Vertigo; Universal	
