= Wish You the Best (song) =

Single by Lewis Capaldi

from the album Broken by Desire to Be Heavenly Sent
- Released: 13 April 2023
- Genre: Pop
- Length: 3:30
- Label: Vertigo; Universal
- Songwriters: Lewis Capaldi; JP Saxe; Malay
- Producers: TMS; Lewis Capaldi

Lewis Capaldi singles chronology
| "How I'm Feeling Now" (2023) | "Wish You the Best" (2023) | "Strangers" (2024) |

Music video
- "Wish You the Best" on YouTube

"Wish You the Best" is a song by the Scottish singer-songwriter Lewis Capaldi, released on 13 April 2023 as the third single from his second studio album Broken by Desire to Be Heavenly Sent. It debuted atop the UK Singles Chart, becoming the third single from the album to reach the top and Capaldi's fifth number one overall.

== Commercial performance ==
The song debuted at number one on the UK Singles Chart dated 21 April 2023, making it Capaldi's fifth overall number-one song on the chart. It was helped to number one by sales of a CD single, with 16,800 sales coming from the format.

== Music video ==
The music video was released on 14 April 2023. Its storyline is based on Greyfriars Bobby, a terrier dog in 19th-century Scotland that visited the grave of his owner for 14 years after the owner's death. The dog was played by Winnie, a Cairn Terrier, and the owners are played by veteran actor David Bradley and Tom Lewis. A scene involving Winnie carrying an envelope in her mouth took 10 days of training to get right.

The video tells the story of Willow (Winnie), a dog owned by postman John Fry (Bradley). When John dies, Willow sits in front of his grave before being noticed and adopted by the new postman (Lewis). Just like with John, Willow joins the postman during deliveries, but is also shown to miss John. The video ends with Willow herself dying and the postman placing her collar on John's grave.

Following the release of the video, people took to TikTok to film their reactions, with most reduced to tears at the end of the song. Capaldi responded to many of the TikTok videos laughing.

== Charts ==
=== Weekly charts ===
Weekly chart performance for "Wish You the Best"
| Chart (2023–2024) | Peak position |
|---|---|
| Australia (ARIA) | 23 |
| Austria (Ö3 Austria Top 40) | 69 |
| Belgium (Ultratop 50 Flanders) | 16 |
| Canada Hot 100 (Billboard) | 19 |
| Canada AC (Billboard) | 16 |
| Canada CHR/Top 40 (Billboard) | 10 |
| Canada Hot AC (Billboard) | 16 |
| Czech Republic Airplay (ČNS IFPI) | 74 |
| Czech Republic Singles Digital (ČNS IFPI) | 79 |
| France (SNEP) | 59 |
| Global 200 (Billboard) | 87 |
| Ireland (IRMA) | 4 |
| Lebanon (Lebanese Top 20) | 12 |
| Netherlands (Dutch Top 40) | 16 |
| Netherlands (Single Top 100) | 30 |
| New Zealand (Recorded Music NZ) | 22 |
| Norway (VG-lista) | 28 |
| Slovakia Singles Digital (ČNS IFPI) | 96 |
| South Korea BGM (Circle) | 113 |
| Sweden (Sverigetopplistan) | 77 |
| Switzerland (Schweizer Hitparade) | 34 |
| UK Singles (Official Charts) | 1 |
| US Bubbling Under Hot 100 (Billboard) | 3 |
| US Adult Contemporary (Billboard) | 14 |
| US Adult Pop Airplay (Billboard) | 8 |
| US Digital Song Sales (Billboard) | 25 |
| US Pop Airplay (Billboard) | 29 |

=== Year-end charts ===
2023 year-end chart performance for "Wish You the Best"
| Chart (2023) | Position |
|---|---|
| Belgium (Ultratop Flanders) | 66 |
| Canada (Canadian Hot 100) | 64 |
| Netherlands (Dutch Top 40) | 58 |
| UK Singles (OCC) | 49 |
| US Adult Top 40 (Billboard) | 28 |

2024 year-end chart performance for "Wish You the Best"
| Chart (2024) | Position |
|---|---|
| US Adult Contemporary (Billboard) | 44 |

== Certifications ==
Certification for "Wish You the Best"
| Region | Certification | Certified units/sales |
|---|---|---|
| Australia (ARIA) | Platinum | 70,000^{‡} |
| France (SNEP) | Platinum | 200,000^{‡} |
| New Zealand (RMNZ) | Platinum | 30,000^{‡} |
| United Kingdom (BPI) | Platinum | 600,000^{‡} |
^{‡} Sales+streaming figures based on certification alone.

== Release history ==
Release history and formats for "Wish You the Best"
| Region | Date | Format(s) | Label(s) | Ref. |
|---|---|---|---|---|
| Various | 13 April 2023 | Digital download; streaming | Vertigo; Universal | |
| United Kingdom | 14 April 2023 | CD | Vertigo | |
| United States | 17 April 2023 | Hot adult contemporary radio | Capitol | |
| Italy | 21 April 2023 | Radio | Universal | |
| United States | 2 June 2023 | 7-inch vinyl | Capitol | |
