= Pointless (song) =

Single by Lewis Capaldi

from the album Broken by Desire to Be Heavenly Sent
- Released: 2 December 2022
- Genre: Pop
- Length: 3:48
- Label: Vertigo; Universal
- Songwriters: Lewis Capaldi; Johnny McDaid; Steve Mac; Ed Sheeran
- Producer: Steve Mac

Lewis Capaldi singles chronology
| "Forget Me" (2022) | "Pointless" (2022) | "How I'm Feeling Now" (2023) |

Music video
- "Pointless" on YouTube

"Pointless" is a song by singer-songwriter Lewis Capaldi. It was released on 2 December 2022 as the second single from his second studio album, Broken by Desire to Be Heavenly Sent (2023). "Pointless" reached number-one in the UK Singles Chart on 13 January 2023, becoming Capaldi's fourth number-one single in the United Kingdom.

== Background ==
"Pointless" was written by Capaldi, Johnny McDaid, Steve Mac and Ed Sheeran. Capaldi posted previews of the song in November 2022. In an interview with The Big Issue, he explained that the track is about "being in love" and that he hopes to have it played at weddings. The song originally stems from an unfinished track that Mac, McDaid and Sheeran had been working on. After hearing it, Capaldi "tweaked it a little bit" and put his "stamp" on it, writing the chorus and the middle eight.

== Music and lyrics ==
Words and Music for "Pointless" were written by Lewis Capaldi, Ed Sheeran, Johnny McDaid and Steve Mac. The song was originally published in the key of E Major and starts with E/A/B/E/A/B/E progression with lyrics "I bring her coffee in the morning, she brings me inner peace. I take her out to fancy restaurants, she takes the sadness out of me.". The tempo of the score is "Ballad".

== Music video ==
The music video was directed by Hector Dockrill. It tells the story of a single mother, played by Irish actress Niamh Algar, raising her son, played by British actor George Jaques.

== Charts ==
=== Weekly charts ===
Weekly chart performance for "Pointless"
| Chart (2022–2023) | Peak position |
|---|---|
| Australia Digital Tracks (ARIA) | 15 |
| Belgium (Ultratop 50 Flanders) | 34 |
| Croatia (HRT) | 25 |
| Czech Republic Airplay (ČNS IFPI) | 37 |
| Global 200 (Billboard) | 111 |
| Hungary (Rádiós Top 40) | 34 |
| Hungary (Single Top 40) | 21 |
| Ireland (IRMA) | 7 |
| Netherlands (Dutch Top 40) | 20 |
| Netherlands (Single Top 100) | 36 |
| New Zealand Hot Singles (RMNZ) | 4 |
| Slovakia Airplay (ČNS IFPI) | 16 |
| Sweden (Sverigetopplistan) | 48 |
| Switzerland (Schweizer Hitparade) | 61 |
| UK Singles (OCC) | 1 |

=== Year-end charts ===
Year-end chart performance for "Pointless"
| Chart (2023) | Position |
|---|---|
| Netherlands (Dutch Top 40) | 77 |
| UK Singles (OCC) | 47 |

== Certifications ==
Certifications for "Pointless"
| Region | Certification | Certified units/sales |
|---|---|---|
| Australia (ARIA) | Gold | 35,000^{‡} |
| Brazil (Pro-Música Brasil) | Gold | 20,000^{‡} |
| New Zealand (RMNZ) | Gold | 15,000^{‡} |
| United Kingdom (BPI) | Platinum | 600,000^{‡} |
^{‡} Sales+streaming figures based on certification alone.
