= Lewis Capaldi: How I'm Feeling Now =

2023 documentary film

- Official release poster
- Directed by: Joe Pearlman
- Produced by: Sam Bridger; Isabel Davis; Joe Pearlman; Alice Rhodes
- Cinematography: Sebastian Feehan
- Edited by: Dan Setford
- Production company: Pulse Films
- Distributed by: Netflix
- Release date: 5 April 2023
- Running time: 96 minutes

Lewis Capaldi: How I'm Feeling Now is a 2023 documentary film directed by Joe Pearlman which details Scottish singer-songwriter Lewis Capaldi's journey from a teen with a viral performance to a Grammy-nominated pop star.

== Synopsis ==
The film explores Capaldi's musical career starting from his adolescence and his teen years, up to the release of his debut studio album, Divinely Uninspired to a Hellish Extent, as well as his mental health struggles, Tourette's diagnosis, and the obstacles he faces during the creation of his sophomore studio album, Broken by Desire to Be Heavenly Sent, and reconnecting with family and Scottish roots after returning to his home of Whitburn, West Lothian due to the COVID-19 pandemic.

== Release and promotion ==
The documentary was officially announced on 9 March 2023, with Capaldi himself posting a video on social media dressed in costumes from Netflix's most popular shows (Bridgerton, Squid Game, Tiger King, Orange Is the New Black, Money Heist and Wednesday) before switching back to casual clothing to tell the news of the release of Lewis Capaldi: How I'm Feeling Now.

On 16 March 2023, the trailer for the documentary was released. A day later, on 17 March 2023, Capaldi released the promotional single for the documentary, titled "How I'm Feeling Now". The song talks about Capaldi's struggles with mental health and the life-changing effects of fame. The documentary officially premiered on Netflix on 5 April 2023.

== Reception ==
On the review aggregator website Rotten Tomatoes, 89% of 9 critics' reviews are positive. Metacritic, which uses a weighted average, assigned the film a score of 66 out of 100, based on 5 critics, indicating "generally favorable" reviews.

Ben Beaumont-Thomas of The Guardian rated the documentary with three out of five stars, saying, "Pearlman shows that Capaldi has become even more of a celebrity cliche, the star who’s been on a journey and come out the other side – but you imagine Capaldi, with his indefatigable wryness, is all too aware of that." Reviewing the documentary for The Telegraph, Neil McCormick, giving the documentary four out of five stars, saying that after "getting up close and (very) personal" with Capaldi, "I defy any viewer not to end up rooting for Capaldi to overcome his demons and knock out yet another sentimental power ballad about the general misery of his existence."

Chris Azzopardi of The New York Times said the documentary "manages to escape most of the promotional trappings of its ilk, striking a more meaningful note than other pop star docs." Emily Bootle of The i Paper gave the documentary with three stars, pointing out "a sense of instability", saying, "You are never quite clear if you’re watching a film about an “ordinary” famous person, or a “famous” ordinary person – and it seems a key issue for Capaldi is that he doesn’t know, either." Bootle then continues on to say that he has now become "a fish out of water."
