= Before You Go (Lewis Capaldi song) =

2019 single by Lewis Capaldi

Single by Lewis Capaldi

from the album Divinely Uninspired to a Hellish Extent (Extended Edition)
- Released: 19 November 2019
- Length: 3:35
- Label: Vertigo Berlin; Universal
- Songwriters: Lewis Capaldi; Ben Kohn; Pete Kelleher; Phil Plested; Tom Barnes
- Producer: TMS

Lewis Capaldi singles chronology
"Hold Me While You Wait" (2019)	"Before You Go" (2019)	"Forget Me" (2022)

Music video
- "Before You Go" on YouTube

"Before You Go" is a song by Scottish singer-songwriter Lewis Capaldi, released as a single from the extended edition of his debut studio album Divinely Uninspired to a Hellish Extent on 19 November 2019. The song was made available upon pre-order of the extended edition. The song was sent to US radio stations on 6 January 2020, as his second US single. It reached number one on the Irish Singles Chart in November 2019, and on the UK Singles Chart in January 2020, becoming Capaldi's second chart-topper in the UK and third in Ireland.

== Background and composition ==
Capaldi revealed in a social media post that the song was "by far the most personal tune" he had ever written. According to Idolator, the song "deals with the emotional aftermath of suicide", and was inspired by the suicide of Capaldi's aunt while Capaldi was a child. "Before You Go" is played in the tempo of 112 BPM and key signature of E♭ major.

== Critical reception ==
Clash's Robin Murray called the track "trademark Capaldi", further describing it as "a rousing piece of acoustic songwriting with a driving vocal".

== Music video ==
Released on 24 January 2020, and directed by Kyle Thrash, the video is of happy moments recalled by a group of friends as they pay tribute to a young woman (played by actress Sasha Lane), whose suicide has shocked them, with clips of Capaldi playing his guitar and singing appearing occasionally.

The video has gained over 440 million views as of October 2025.

== Personnel ==
Credits adapted from Tidal.

- Lewis Capaldi – songwriting, vocals
- Ben Kohn – songwriting, production, bass guitar
- Pete Kelleher – songwriting, production, keyboards
- Tom Bames – songwriting, production, drums
- Phil Plested – songwriting, background vocals
- Vern Asbury – guitar
- Rory Dewar – art design
- Robert Vosgien – master engineering
- Mark "Spike" Stent – mixing
- Chris Bishop – vocal engineering

== Charts ==
=== Weekly charts ===
Weekly chart performance for "Before You Go"
Chart (2019–2021)	Peak position
Australia (ARIA)	7
Austria (Ö3 Austria Top 40)	20
Belgium (Ultratop 50 Flanders)	2
Belgium (Ultratop 50 Wallonia)	4
Canada Hot 100 (Billboard)	16
Czech Republic Airplay (ČNS IFPI)	1
Czech Republic Singles Digital (ČNS IFPI)	20
Denmark (Tracklisten)	17
Ecuador (National-Report)	64
France (SNEP)	49
Germany (GfK)	42
Global 200 (Billboard)	32
Greece International (IFPI)	28
Hungary (Rádiós Top 40)	21
Hungary (Single Top 40)	17
Hungary (Stream Top 40)	36
Iceland (Tónlistinn)	11
Ireland (IRMA)	1
Italy (FIMI)	17
Lebanon Airplay (Lebanese Top 20)	13
Lithuania (AGATA)	29
Malaysia (RIM)	6
Netherlands (Dutch Top 40)	2
Netherlands (Single Top 100)	7
New Zealand (Recorded Music NZ)	9
Norway (VG-lista)	9
Poland Airplay (ZPAV)	7
Portugal (AFP)	41
Romania (Airplay 100)	7
Scottish Singles Sales (Official Charts)	1
Singapore (RIAS)	5
Slovakia Airplay (ČNS IFPI)	3
Slovakia Singles Digital (ČNS IFPI)	34
Slovenia (SloTop50)	11
Spain (PROMUSICAE)	78
Sweden (Sverigetopplistan)	23
Switzerland (Schweizer Hitparade)	5
UK Singles (Official Charts)	1
US Billboard Hot 100	9
US Adult Contemporary (Billboard)	2
US Adult Pop Airplay (Billboard)	1
US Dance Airplay (Billboard)	11
US Pop Airplay (Billboard)	1
US Rolling Stone Top 100	34

=== Year-end charts ===
2020 year-end chart performance for "Before You Go"
Chart (2020)	Position
Australia (ARIA)	8
Austria (Ö3 Austria Top 40)	42
Belgium (Ultratop Flanders)	3
Belgium (Ultratop Wallonia)	6
Canada (Canadian Hot 100)	15
Denmark (Tracklisten)	16
France (SNEP)	89
Germany (Official German Charts)	88
Hungary (Rádiós Top 40)	40
Ireland (IRMA)	7
Italy (FIMI)	60
Netherlands (Dutch Top 40)	10
Netherlands (Single Top 100)	7
New Zealand (Recorded Music NZ)	13
Poland (Polish Airplay Top 100)	23
Romania (Airplay 100)	33
Sweden (Sverigetopplistan)	25
Switzerland (Schweizer Hitparade)	11
UK Singles (OCC)	4
US Billboard Hot 100	21
US Adult Contemporary (Billboard)	17
US Adult Top 40 (Billboard)	6
US Dance/Mix Show Airplay (Billboard)	37
US Mainstream Top 40 (Billboard)	6

2021 year-end chart performance for "Before You Go"
Chart (2021)	Position
Australia (ARIA)	71
Denmark (Tracklisten)	97
Global 200 (Billboard)	60
Portugal (AFP)	105
UK Singles (OCC)	74
US Adult Contemporary (Billboard)	2
US Adult Top 40 (Billboard)	49

== Certifications ==
Certifications and sales for "Before You Go"
Region	Certification	Certified units/sales
Australia (ARIA)	9× Platinum	630,000^{‡}
Austria (IFPI Austria)	3× Platinum	90,000^{‡}
Belgium (BRMA)	2× Platinum	80,000^{‡}
Brazil (Pro-Música Brasil)	3× Diamond	480,000^{‡}
Canada (Music Canada)	5× Platinum	400,000^{‡}
Denmark (IFPI Danmark)	3× Platinum	270,000^{‡}
France (SNEP)	Diamond	333,333^{‡}
Germany (BVMI)	Platinum	400,000^{‡}
Italy (FIMI)	3× Platinum	300,000^{‡}
New Zealand (RMNZ)	7× Platinum	210,000^{‡}
Poland (ZPAV)	3× Platinum	150,000^{‡}
Portugal (AFP)	3× Platinum	30,000^{‡}
Spain (Promusicae)	3× Platinum	180,000^{‡}
United Kingdom (BPI)	5× Platinum	3,000,000^{‡}
United States (RIAA)	Platinum	1,000,000^{‡}
Streaming
Greece (IFPI Greece)	Gold	1,000,000^{†}
^{‡} Sales+streaming figures based on certification alone.^{†} Streaming-only figures based on certification alone.

== Release history ==
Release dates for "Before You Go"
Country	Date	Format	Label	Ref.
Various	19 November 2019	Digital download; streaming	Vertigo Berlin; Universal	
United Kingdom	22 November 2019	Contemporary hit radio	Vertigo Berlin; Universal	
United Kingdom	7 December 2019	Adult contemporary radio	Vertigo Berlin; Universal	
Italy	13 December 2019	Contemporary hit radio	Universal	
United States	6 January 2020	Adult contemporary radio	Capitol	
United States	7 January 2020	Contemporary hit radio	Capitol	

== Usage in media ==
Capaldi has performed the song for Top of the Pops, the Swiss Music Awards, American Music Awards, Streamy Awards, and Dick Clark's New Year's Rockin' Eve.

American singer Jesse McCartney performed the song during the finale of The Masked Singer's third season. It was also sung by English singer Charlie Simpson during the finale of the UK version's fourth series.

The song was featured in the final scene of the twelfth series finale of the BBC school-based drama Waterloo Road, with the students singing the song in honour of a classmate who recently died in a fire.
