= Hold Me While You Wait =

Single by Lewis Capaldi

from the album Divinely Uninspired to a Hellish Extent
- Released: 3 May 2019
- Length: 3:25
- Label: Vertigo Berlin; Universal
- Songwriters: Lewis Capaldi; Jamie Hartman; Jamie N Commons
- Producers: Edward Holloway; Lewis Capaldi; Nick Atkinson; TMS

Lewis Capaldi singles chronology
"Someone You Loved" (2018)	"Hold Me While You Wait" (2019)	"Before You Go" (2019)

"Hold Me While You Wait" is a song by Scottish singer-songwriter Lewis Capaldi, released as a single from his debut studio album Divinely Uninspired to a Hellish Extent on 3 May 2019. It was released alongside the album pre-order. It debuted at number one on the Irish Singles Chart, number one on the Scottish Singles Chart, and number four on the UK Singles Chart. In Scotland, Capaldi held both the number 1 and number 2 in the official chart, and in the UK, he became the first artist since Ed Sheeran to have 2 songs in the top 5 of the singles chart. The song went on to spend a total of 34 weeks on the UK Singles Chart.

== Background ==
Capaldi said he wrote the song "about the uncertainty of being in a relationship when your partner isn't sure what they want", which he explained as "one of the most desperate places you can find yourself in" due to the "impending hopelessness" of the situation. Capaldi told Music Week that he is not concerned about the commercial performance of the song, as "if it doesn't go on to do what Someone You Loved has done, that's OK as far as I'm concerned because this was never meant to happen in the f**king first place. Don't ask for too much, let's not get greedy."

== Critical reception ==
Idolator called the song "another emotional sucker punch that painstakingly depicts the end of a relationship" like "Someone You Loved", also describing the chorus as "wonderfully depressing".

== Track listing ==
Stream
No.	Title	Length
1.	"Hold Me While You Wait"	3:25
2.	"Someone You Loved"	3:02

== Charts ==
=== Weekly charts ===
Chart (2019)	Peak position
Belgium (Ultratip Bubbling Under Flanders)	20
Czech Republic Airplay (ČNS IFPI)	8
Ireland (IRMA)	1
Italy (FIMI)	39
New Zealand Hot Singles (RMNZ)	13
San Marino (SMRRTV Top 50)	29
Scotland Singles (OCC)	1
Slovakia Airplay (ČNS IFPI)	15
Sweden (Sverigetopplistan)	77
Switzerland (Schweizer Hitparade)	63
UK Singles (OCC)	4

=== Year-end charts ===
Chart (2019)	Position
Iceland (Tónlistinn)	81
Ireland (IRMA)	13
UK Singles (OCC)	14
Chart (2020)	Position
Ireland (IRMA)	48
UK Singles (OCC)	46

== Certifications ==
Region	Certification	Certified units/sales
Australia (ARIA)	4× Platinum	280,000^{‡}
Austria (IFPI Austria)	Platinum	30,000^{‡}
Canada (Music Canada)	5× Platinum	400,000^{‡}
Denmark (IFPI Danmark)	Platinum	90,000^{‡}
Germany (BVMI)	Gold	200,000^{‡}
Italy (FIMI)	Platinum	70,000^{‡}
New Zealand (RMNZ)	4× Platinum	120,000^{‡}
Poland (ZPAV)	Gold	10,000^{‡}
Portugal (AFP)	Platinum	10,000^{‡}
United Kingdom (BPI)	4× Platinum	2,400,000^{‡}
^{‡} Sales+streaming figures based on certification alone.
