= Forget Me =

Single by Lewis Capaldi

from the album Broken by Desire to Be Heavenly Sent
- Released: 9 September 2022
- Genre: Pop
- Length: 3:25
- Label: Vertigo; Universal
- Songwriters: Lewis Capaldi; Michael Pollack; Philip Plested; Tom Barnes; Pete Kelleher; Ben Kohn
- Producers: TMS; Capaldi

Lewis Capaldi singles chronology
"Before You Go" (2019)	"Forget Me" (2022)	"Pointless" (2022)

Music video
- "Forget Me" on YouTube

"Forget Me" is a song by Scottish singer-songwriter Lewis Capaldi. It was released on 9 September 2022 through Vertigo and Universal and serves as the lead single of his second studio album, Broken by Desire to Be Heavenly Sent. "Forget Me" debuted at number one on the UK Singles Chart, giving Capaldi his third number-one single in the United Kingdom, and was also the first new number-one single under the reign of King Charles III. It was nominated for Song of the Year at the 2023 Brit Awards.

== Background and composition ==
The song marks the singer's first release in nearly three years. The song release was accompanied by an open letter, in which Capaldi admits to being nervous about the release, saying, "it could be the beginning of a beautiful chapter in my life, or the very public downward spiral that, let's face it, I'm probably due". According to Capaldi, the song deals with a break-up he experienced the year prior and the "post-life" of his ex he was only able to witness through social media.

The song was described as an "80s-synth inspired track" as well as a "change of pace" in sound for the singer. The 1975's "Somebody Else" inspired the production of the track.

"Forget Me" is performed in the key of E major with a tempo of 102 beats per minute, with Capaldi's vocals ranging from B_{3} to B_{5}.

== Music video ==
The music video was released on 9 September 2022 and was directed by Louis Bhose, who had previously directed the music video for "Grace". The video pays homage to Wham!'s "Club Tropicana" and was filmed at Pikes Hotel in Ibiza, the same hotel where the original "Club Tropicana" video was filmed. About the video, Bhose explained, "You hear a sad song and you expect a sad video. There's catharsis in that. But to go in the other direction completely felt more in line with the Lewis that walked onstage at Glastonbury in full Noel Gallagher getup".

== Charts ==
=== Weekly charts ===
Weekly chart performance
Chart (2022–2023)	Peak position
Australia (ARIA)	21
Austria (Ö3 Austria Top 40)	59
Belgium (Ultratop 50 Flanders)	6
Belgium (Ultratop 50 Wallonia)	14
Canada Hot 100 (Billboard)	11
Canada AC (Billboard)	6
Canada CHR/Top 40 (Billboard)	3
Canada Hot AC (Billboard)	5
CIS Airplay (TopHit)	64
Croatia International Airplay (HRT)	2
Czech Republic Airplay (ČNS IFPI)	1
Denmark (Tracklisten)	20
Estonia Airplay (TopHit)	1
Finland Airplay (Radiosoittolista)	5
France (SNEP)	198
Germany (GfK)	86
Global 200 (Billboard)	48
Hungary (Rádiós Top 40)	31
Hungary (Single Top 40)	33
Iceland (Tónlistinn)	29
Ireland (IRMA)	2
Italy (FIMI)	75
Japan Hot Overseas (Billboard Japan)	9
Latvia Airplay (LAIPA)	20
Lithuania (AGATA)	79
Lithuania Airplay (TopHit)	11
Netherlands (Dutch Top 40)	6
Netherlands (Single Top 100)	22
New Zealand (Recorded Music NZ)	22
Norway (VG-lista)	13
Romania Airplay (TopHit)	52
San Marino (SMRRTV Top 50)	17
Slovakia Airplay (ČNS IFPI)	4
South Africa Streaming (TOSAC)	74
Sweden (Sverigetopplistan)	35
Switzerland (Schweizer Hitparade)	38
Ukraine Airplay (TopHit)	19
UK Singles (Official Charts)	1
US Billboard Hot 100	58
US Adult Contemporary (Billboard)	9
US Adult Pop Airplay (Billboard)	7
US Pop Airplay (Billboard)	16

=== Monthly charts ===
Monthly chart performance for "Forget Me"
Chart (2023)	Peak position
CIS Airplay (TopHit)	71
Czech Republic (Rádio – Top 100)	1
Estonia Airplay (TopHit)	1
Lithuania Airplay (TopHit)	12
Romania Airplay (TopHit)	60
Slovakia (Rádio – Top 100)	5
Ukraine Airplay (TopHit)	20

=== Year-end charts ===
Year-end chart performance
Chart (2022)	Position
Belgium (Ultratop 50 Flanders)	80
Belgium (Ultratop 50 Wallonia)	195
Netherlands (Dutch Top 40)	33
UK Singles (OCC)	40

Chart (2023)	Position
Belgium (Ultratop 50 Flanders)	82
Canada (Canadian Hot 100)	36
CIS Airplay (TopHit)	104
Estonia Airplay (TopHit)	6
Lithuania Airplay (TopHit)	27
Romania Airplay (TopHit)	200
Ukraine Airplay (TopHit)	75
UK Singles (OCC)	25
US Adult Contemporary (Billboard)	12
US Adult Top 40 (Billboard)	21
US Mainstream Top 40 (Billboard)	47
US Radio Songs (Billboard)	55

== Certifications ==
Certifications for "Forget Me"
Region	Certification	Certified units/sales
Australia (ARIA)	2× Platinum	140,000^{‡}
Austria (IFPI Austria)	Platinum	30,000^{‡}
Belgium (BRMA)	Gold	20,000^{‡}
Brazil (Pro-Música Brasil)	Platinum	40,000^{‡}
Denmark (IFPI Danmark)	Platinum	90,000^{‡}
Italy (FIMI)	Gold	50,000^{‡}
Netherlands (NVPI)	Gold	20,000^{‡}
New Zealand (RMNZ)	2× Platinum	60,000^{‡}
United Kingdom (BPI)	2× Platinum	1,200,000^{‡}
^{‡} Sales+streaming figures based on certification alone.

== Release history ==
"Forget Me" release history
Region	Date	Format(s)	Label(s)	Ref.
Various	9 September 2022	Digital download; streaming	Vertigo	
Italy	9 September 2022	Radio	Universal	
United States	13 September 2022	Contemporary hit radio	Capitol	
Germany	14 September 2022	CD	Vertigo	
United Kingdom	16 September 2022	CD	EMI	
United Kingdom	16 September 2022	7-inch vinyl	EMI	
United States	19 September 2022	Hot adult contemporary radio	Capitol	
