= Lewis Capaldi =

Scottish singer-songwriter (born 1996)

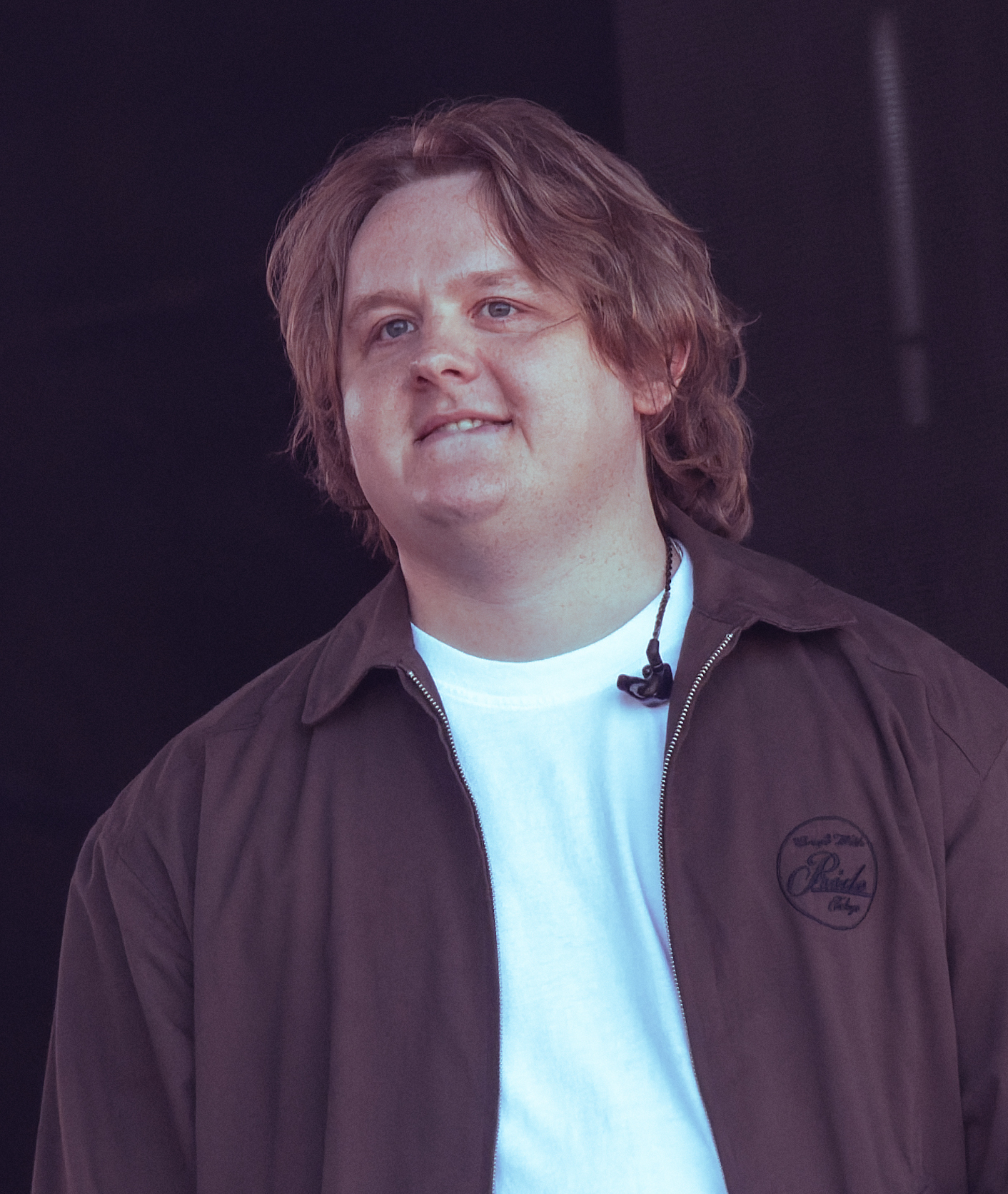
- Capaldi at the 2025 Glastonbury Festival

Background information
- Born: Lewis Marc Capaldi; 7 October 1996 (age 30); Glasgow, Scotland
- Origin: Whitburn, West Lothian, Scotland
- Genres: Pop; blue-eyed soul
- Occupation: Singer-songwriter
- Instruments: Vocals; guitar; piano
- Works: Lewis Capaldi discography
- Years active: 2013–present
- Labels: EMI Records; Vertigo Records; Universal Music Group; Capitol Records
- Website: lewiscapaldi.com

Lewis Marc Capaldi (born 7 October 1996) is a Scottish singer-songwriter and musician. In March 2019, his single "Someone You Loved" (2018) topped the UK Singles Chart where it remained for seven weeks and in November 2019, it reached No. 1 on the US Billboard Hot 100. It was nominated at the 62nd Annual Grammy Awards for Song of the Year and won the 2020 Brit Award for Song of the Year. "Someone You Loved" was the bestselling single of 2019 in the UK. Capaldi was nominated for the Critics' Choice Award at the 2019 Brit Awards. He also won the 2020 Brit Award for Best New Artist. In May 2020, it was announced that his song "Someone You Loved" had become the longest-running top 10 UK single of all time by a British artist.

On 17 May 2019, he released his debut album, Divinely Uninspired to a Hellish Extent, which remained at the top of the UK Albums Chart for six weeks. It was the best-selling album of 2019 and 2020 in the UK. His second album Broken by Desire to Be Heavenly Sent (2023) was supported by the lead single "Forget Me", released in 2022.

== Early life ==
Lewis Marc Capaldi was born on 7 October 1996, in Glasgow, the largest city in Scotland. He lived there until he was four years old when his family moved to East Whitburn in West Lothian. He is of Scottish, Irish, and Italian ancestry, and has three older siblings. His mother becoming pregnant with Lewis came as a surprise to his family, being called a sort of "Immaculate Conception", because his father had a vasectomy. Lewis' passion for performing started after he sang on stage at four on a family trip in France. He learned how to play guitar when he was nine. Soon, he began writing songs and playing gigs by sneaking into pubs with the help of his eldest brother.

== Career ==
=== 2014–2016: Beginnings ===
In 2014, Capaldi took part in a three-date tour as part of the Hit the Road project run by The Scottish Music Centre. He played in Dumfries, Edinburgh, and Fort William alongside Jacob, Rory Green, and Zoë Bestel. When he was 18, his manager Ryan Walter discovered him by an iPhone recording that was recorded in his bedroom and uploaded to his SoundCloud account. The day after first contacting Capaldi, Walter flew from the U.S. to Britain to hear Capaldi play live. In 2016, Capaldi graduated with an HND in Music from New College Lanarkshire, Motherwell.

=== 2017–2018: Extended plays and increased recognition ===
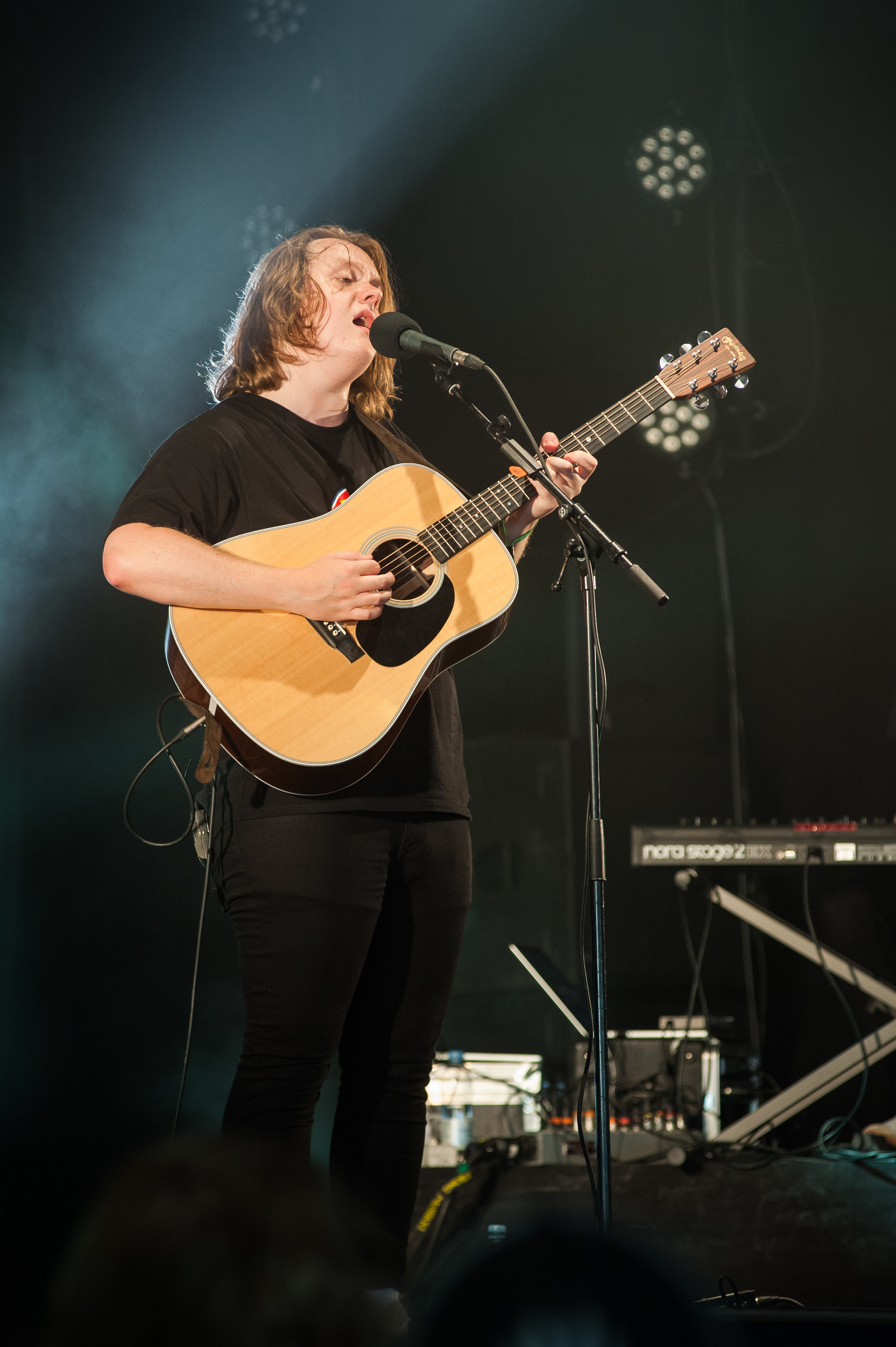
Capaldi performing at the 2018 Ilosaarirock Festival in Joensuu, Finland

He released his first single, "Bruises", independently on 31 March 2017. The song quickly amassed almost 28 million plays on Spotify worldwide, making him the fastest-ever unsigned artist to reach 25 million plays on the platform. The song was later re-released as a single in 2019 and went to No. 6 on the UK Singles Chart. After the initial release of the song, he was signed to the German branch of Universal Music Group and was assigned to the Vertigo Berlin division. His releases are distributed in the UK by Virgin EMI Records and in the US by Capitol Records. His debut single, as well as the songs "Lost on You" and "Fade", were featured on his first extended play, Bloom and later on an album. He supported English singer-songwriters Rag'n'Bone Man and Jake Bugg on their tours in the autumn of 2017.

In January 2018, he joined Milky Chance, a German rock band, on their North American leg of the Blossom tour. On 23 February, his collaboration "Rush" with Canadian singer and songwriter Jessie Reyez was released. Irish singer Niall Horan invited Capaldi to support him on two dates on his Flicker World Tour at the Glasgow SEC Armadillo in March. In May, Capaldi joined British singer Sam Smith on their The Thrill of It All European Tour, opening for Smith over 19 dates. He then had his own headlining tour across the UK and Europe. Capaldi was named one of Vevo DSCVR 'Artists to Watch 2018', and he won Best Acoustic Act at the Scottish Alternative Music Awards. He was also long-listed for BBC Music's Sound of 2018. In August, Irish Indie rock band Kodaline invited Capaldi to open for them at a concert in Belfast. In addition, he performed at many festivals during the summer of 2018 including Lollapalooza, Bonnaroo, Firefly, Mountain Jam, Osheaga, Reading & Leeds Festival, Rize, and TRNSMT. On 8 November, Capaldi's second extended play, Breach, which included his single "Tough", was released.

=== 2019–2020: Divinely Uninspired to a Hellish Extent ===
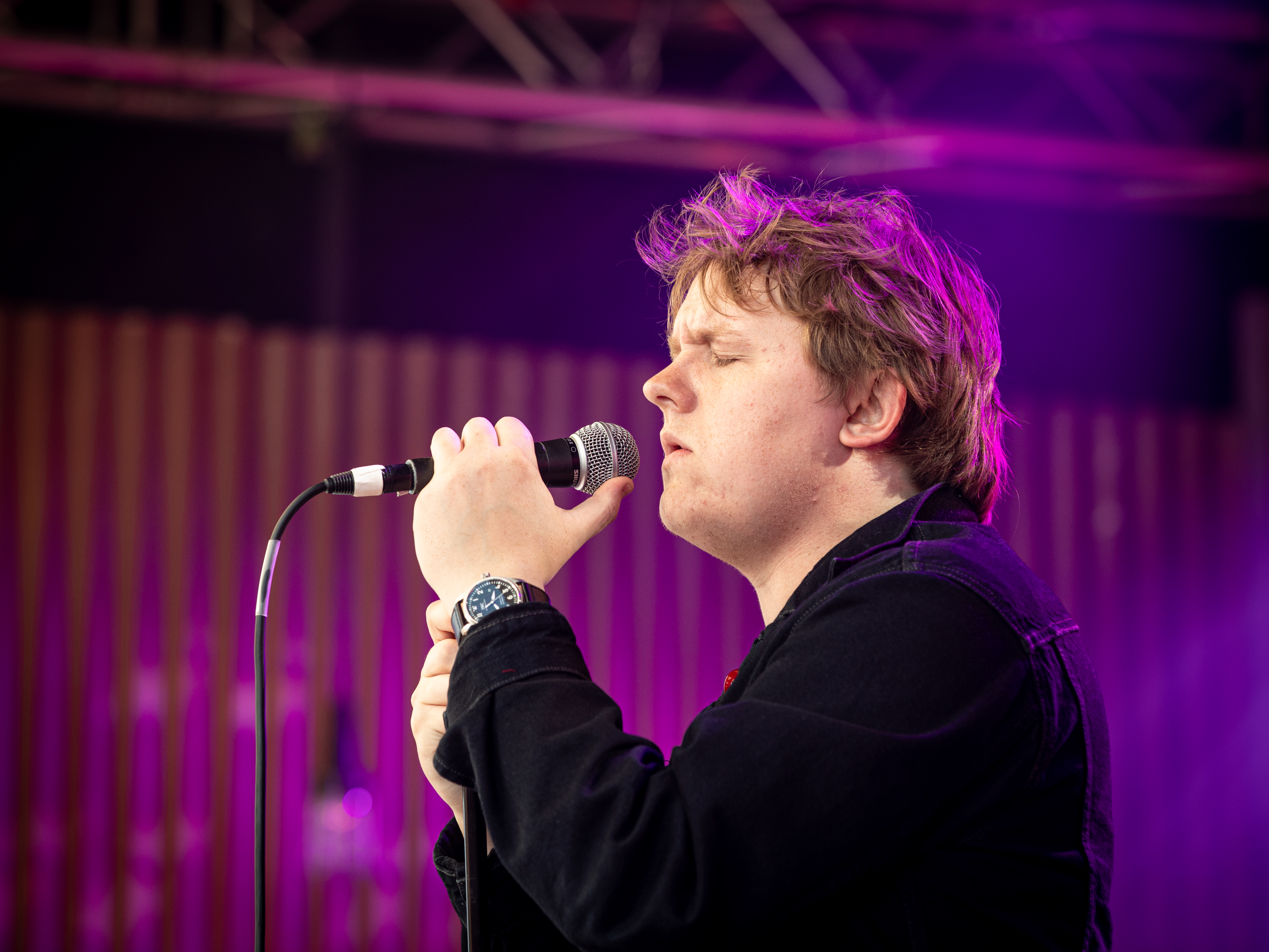
Capaldi performing in September 2019 at the SWR3 New Pop Festival in Baden-Baden, Germany

The Breach track "Someone You Loved" became Capaldi's breakthrough single, charting in 29 countries. During his 2019 tour with Bastille, the song reached number one on the UK Singles Chart and remained at the position for 7 weeks. It also reached number one on the Billboard Hot 100, making him the first Scottish solo artist to top the US charts since Sheena Easton in 1981. The song received a Grammy nomination for Song of the Year. According to the IFPI, the song was the 9th biggest global single of 2019. Another Breach track "Grace" reached a new peak of No. 9 in the UK that year. Both songs were included on his debut album Divinely Uninspired to a Hellish Extent. The instant grat single "Hold Me While You Wait" entered the UK Singles Chart at No. 4. The album was the biggest selling album in the UK in five years, spending five weeks at number one in its first six weeks of release.

Capaldi was nominated for the Brit Critics' Choice Award at the 2019 Brit Awards, but lost to Sam Fender. At the end of March, Capaldi supported the Irish band Picture This at their shows in Ireland. In April, the video game Days Gone that had featured his self-written song "Days Gone Quiet" in the end credits was released. The song received nominations from the Game Audio Network Guild Awards and the NAVGTR Awards.

Over the summer of 2019, Capaldi performed at many festivals including the Belsonic festival in Belfast, where he opened for the Killers, and the Glastonbury Festival. On 5 August, he performed songs from his album with the Manchester Camerata for a special Live Lounge Symphony concert in Croxteth, Liverpool. From 16 to 26 August, he supported Ed Sheeran at the end of his Divide world tour, playing four gigs with him in Ipswich and Leeds. Towards the end of 2019, an extended edition of his debut album was released along with the single "Before You Go", which became his second UK Singles Chart-topper on 31 January 2020.

Capaldi became the first artist to sell out an arena tour before the release of an album. The shows sold out in ten minutes upon tickets becoming available, with Capaldi playing to over a quarter of a million people in March 2020. The initiative LiveLive [/lɪv/ /laɪv/ ] was launched to help fans have a more comfortable experience at his concerts. At the 2020 Brit Awards, Capaldi received three nominations, winning two awards. Two songs written by Capaldi were also released in 2020: Rita Ora's "How to Be Lonely" and Sigala's "Lasting Lover".

=== 2021–2023: Broken by Desire to Be Heavenly Sent ===
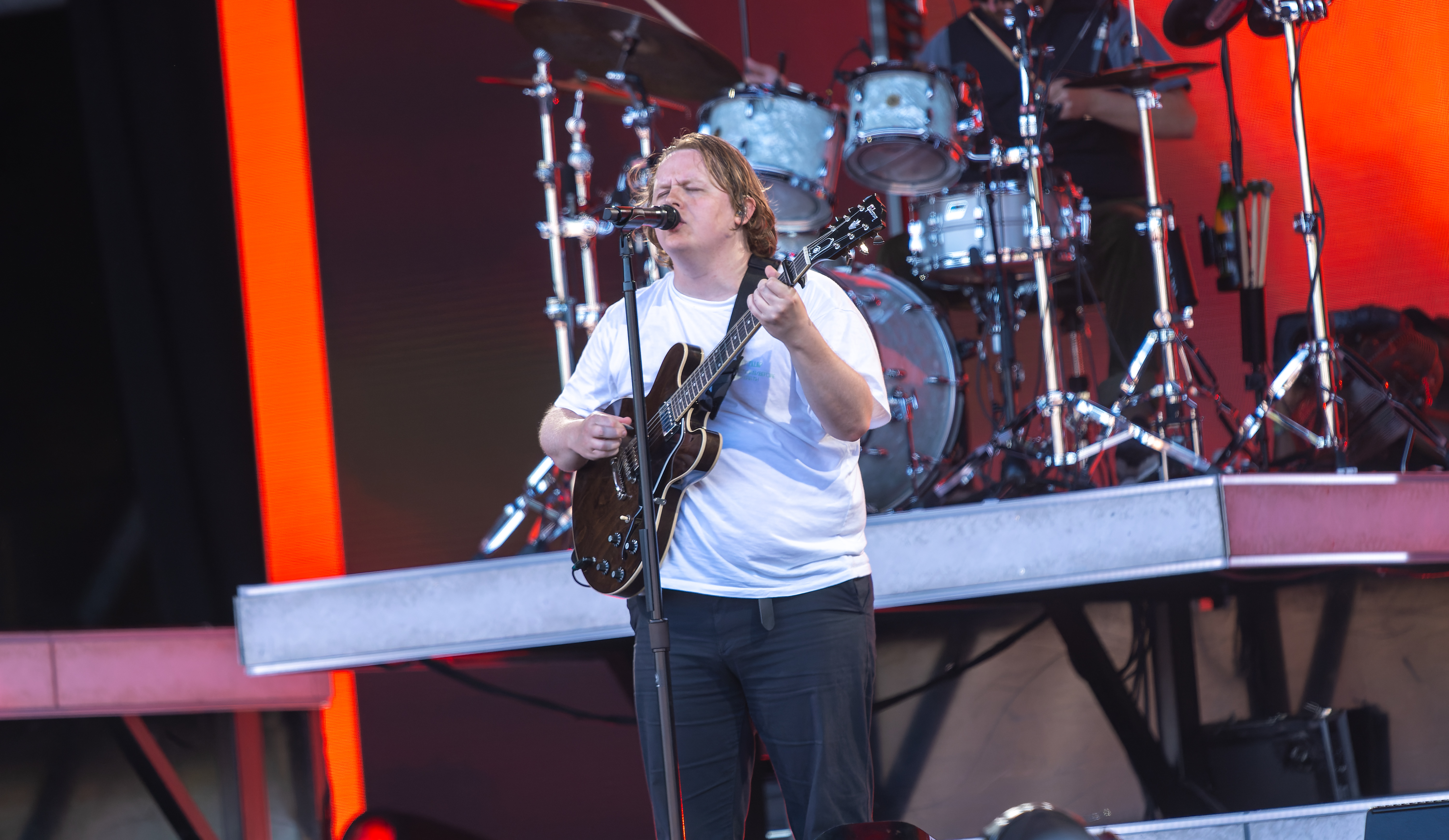
Capaldi performing at the 2023 Glastonbury Festival

In March 2021, Capaldi announced that he postponed upcoming shows to work on his second album. He returned in the summer of 2022 to play his postponed shows, including his headlining slots at the TRNSMT Festival, the Latitude Festival, and the Isle of Wight Festival. The lead single "Forget Me" from his second album, Broken by Desire to Be Heavenly Sent, was released in September 2022 and it became his first song to debut at the top of the UK Singles Chart. His frozen pizza range Big Sexy Pizza was also released later that month in the UK supermarkets Iceland and Tesco.

Capaldi achieved his fourth number-one single when "Pointless" climbed to the top of the UK charts in January 2023. In April 2023, Capaldi achieved his fifth number-one song on the UK Singles Chart with "Wish You the Best". In May 2023, Capaldi was announced to be performing an intimate warm-up set in June before Reading and Leeds Festival where James Marriott would support, though Capaldi later cancelled the gig due to his poor mental health.

=== 2023–present: Hiatus, return and Survive EP ===
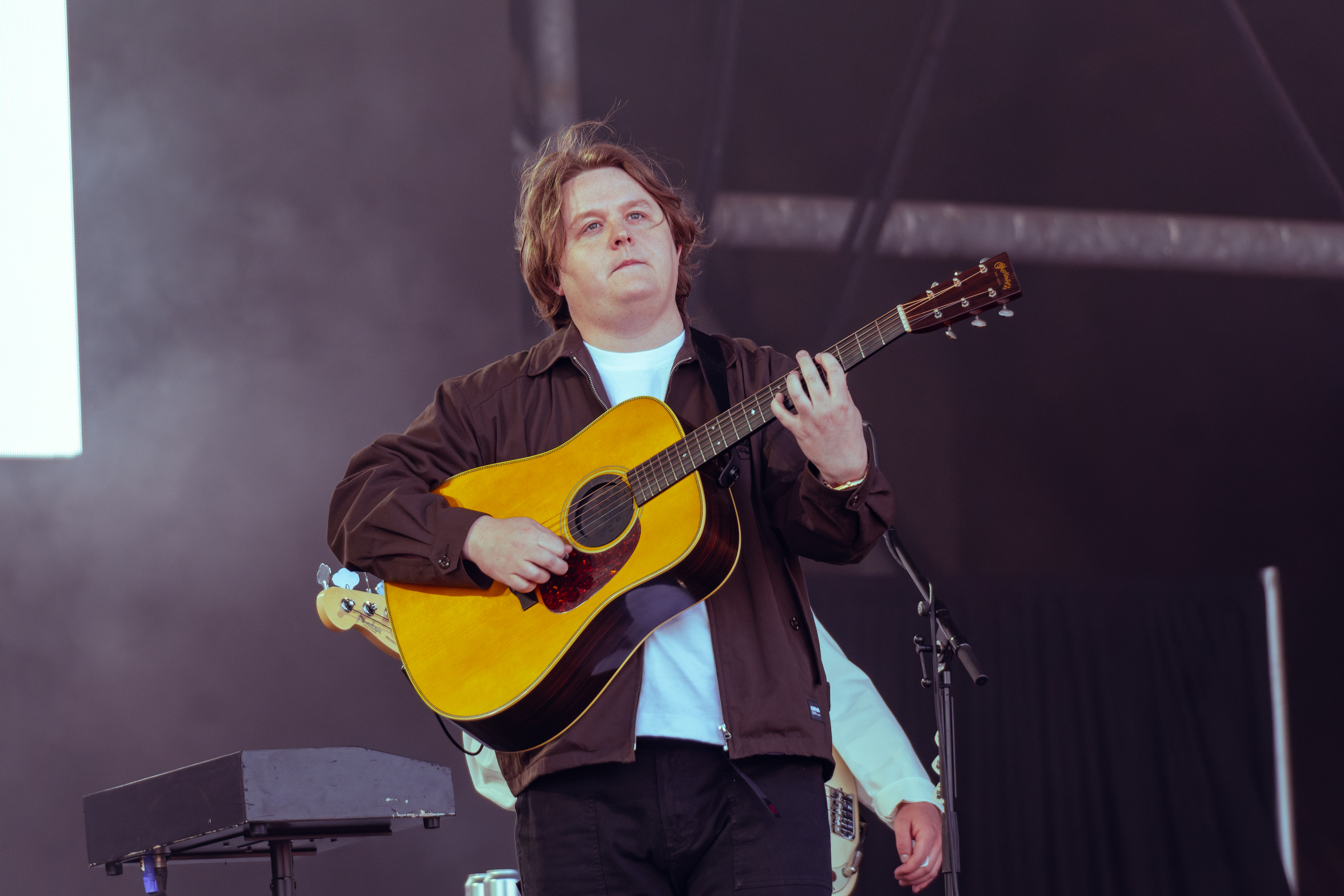
Capaldi performing at the 2025 Glastonbury Festival

In June 2023, Capaldi announced that he was taking an extended and indefinite break from touring, citing a need to focus on his mental and physical health. Four days earlier, during the final song of his nine-song set at Glastonbury Festival 2023, he first thanked the crowd and explained he had recently been diagnosed with Tourette syndrome (Tourette's); about 30 seconds into the song, when the tics associated with Tourette's complicated his ability to sing, concertgoers joined in, then lowered their volume each time he picked up the vocals, with the concertgoers then finishing the performance for him when he was only able to look on. On 1 January 2024, Capaldi gave fans an update on his health, as well as stating that he would be extending his hiatus further, and released an extended edition of Broken by Desire to Be Heavenly Sent as a surprise-release on New Year's Day. On 11 April 2025, Capaldi officially released his cover of Britney Spears' "Everytime" to download and streaming sites, debuting on the UK Singles Downloads Chart at number 36.

Capaldi performing at the 2026 Montreux Jazz Festival

In June 2025, he returned to Glastonbury with a surprise set, his first public performance since announcing his extended break. On the same day, he released his comeback single "Survive" which he performed at Glastonbury and peaked at Number 1 in the UK charts following his performance, his sixth number-one in the UK. This would later be revealed as the lead single to his next extended play. In September 2025, he released his second single "Something in the Heavens", which peaked at No. 3 on the UK Charts. In October 2025, he released his third single "Almost", and announced his next extended play, titled Survive, which was released on 14 November 2025, along with the fourth and final single, "The Day That I Die". On 17 April 2026, a reissued version of the EP was released along with a bonus single, "Stay Love".

Over the summer of 2026, Capaldi performed at many festivals including TRNSMT, the Isle of Wight Festival, and BST Hyde Park. During his festival run, he confirmed that his third studio album was in the works and that after the summer he would step away from the spotlight to focus on working on the project.

== Personal life ==
Capaldi is a fan of association football and supports the Glasgow-based Celtic F.C. He and actor Peter Capaldi are second cousins once removed. Peter appeared in Lewis' music video for "Someone You Loved".

After his rise to fame, Lewis Capaldi started feeling anxiety and a pressure to perform, and he started to have nervous tics. In September 2022, he revealed that he had been diagnosed with Tourette syndrome. During the COVID-19 pandemic, he moved back to his parents' house in Whitburn, Scotland to work on his second album. In April 2023, his documentary How I'm Feeling Now was released on Netflix. Capaldi and Scottish actress Ellie MacDowall dated from June 2023 to August 2024.

== Influences ==
Growing up, Capaldi listened to heavy metal bands including Slipknot and Avenged Sevenfold, pop-punk bands such as Blink-182 and Busted, rock bands like Oasis, and indie rock bands such as the View. He discovered a love for "soulful pop music" from the work of Paolo Nutini and Joe Cocker. Capaldi has expressed admiration for The 1975, the Macabees, Arctic Monkeys, the Beatles, and Bob Dylan. Adele and Kings of Leon have inspired his songwriting.

== Discography ==
- Divinely Uninspired to a Hellish Extent (2019)
- Broken by Desire to Be Heavenly Sent (2023)

== Tours ==
Headlining

- Divinely Uninspired to a Hellish Extent Tour (2019–2020)
- Broken by Desire to Be Heavenly Sent Tour (2023)

Supporting

- Rag'n'Bone Man – The Overproof Tour (2017)
- Milky Chance – The Blossom Tour (2018)
- Niall Horan – Flicker World Tour (2018)
- Sam Smith – The Thrill of It All Tour (2018)
- Bastille – Still Avoiding Tomorrow Tour (2019)
- Picture This – MDVRN LV Tour (2019)
- Ed Sheeran – ÷ Tour (2019)

== Filmography ==
Year	Title	Role	Ref.
2019	The Lewis Capaldi Symphony	BBC One special	
2020	Birthday Song	YouTube documentary	
2020	Cup of Joe	Episode: "Berlin With David Hasselhoff & Lewis Capaldi"	
2022	Niall Horan's Homecoming: Road to Mullingar with Lewis Capaldi	Television special	
2023	Lewis Capaldi: How I'm Feeling Now	Netflix documentary	

=== Music videos ===
Year	Song	Artist	Role	Ref
2026	"Opalite"	Taylor Swift	The Greatest Mall Photographer to Ever Do It	
