= Divinely Uninspired to a Hellish Extent =

Studio album by Lewis Capaldi
- Released: 17 May 2019
- Length: 42:17
- Label: Vertigo; Capitol
- Producer: Nick Atkinson; Edd Holloway; Jamie Hartman; Mike Cave; James Earp; TMS; David Sneddon; Anu Pillai; Phil Cook; Malay

Lewis Capaldi chronology
Breach (2018)	Divinely Uninspired to a Hellish Extent (2019)	Broken by Desire to Be Heavenly Sent (2023)

Extended edition cover

Singles from Divinely Uninspired to a Hellish Extent
- 1. "Bruises" Released: 30 March 2017; 2. "Lost on You" Released: 7 July 2017; 3. "Fade" Released: 9 September 2017; 4. "Grace" Released: 21 September 2018; 5. "Someone You Loved" Released: 8 November 2018; 6. "Hold Me While You Wait" Released: 3 May 2019

Divinely Uninspired to a Hellish Extent is the debut studio album by Scottish singer-songwriter Lewis Capaldi. It was released on 17 May 2019 through Vertigo Records in Europe and Capitol Records in the United States, and distributed globally by Universal Music. It includes the top 10 single "Grace", the UK and US number one single "Someone You Loved" and "Hold Me While You Wait", among several songs previously included on Capaldi's 2017 and 2018 EPs Bloom and Breach, respectively. Tracks "Mercy", "Tough" and "Something Borrowed (Demo)" did not make the final cut of the album. Capaldi went on tour in support of the record in May 2019, and finished the tour in October 2019. It peaked at number one in the UK and Ireland, becoming the fastest-selling album of the year and also outselling all of the top 10 combined in both countries. It was certified gold in the UK a week after its release. The album was the best selling album in the UK in 2019 and 2020, with "Someone You Loved" being the best selling single of 2019 in the UK.

== Background ==
In the album announcement, Capaldi said: "Everyone always tells you about how amazing recording their first album was and how they'll always look back on the 'process' with fond memories. I will look back on it as an extremely stressful time that somehow also managed to be extremely boring." He went on to describe that while he liked "building up the songs", he did not enjoy re-recording guitar parts and the long mixing process. Capaldi also joked that he did not think that when he got to release his debut album that he "would give it a name as stupid I have, but here we are". MTV said Capaldi "might have just won Best Album Title of 2019".

The album title comes from a lyric in an unreleased song called “Figure It Out”.

== Critical reception ==
Professional ratings
Aggregate scores
Source	Rating
AnyDecentMusic?	5.3/10
Metacritic	70/100
Review scores
Source	Rating
Clash	4/10
Evening Standard	3/5 stars
The Guardian	3/5 stars
The Independent	4/5 stars
The Line of Best Fit	8/10
NME	2/5 stars
Q	4/5 stars
The Skinny	4/5 stars
The Times	3/5 stars
Vice	A−

Ben Beaumont-Thomas of The Guardian said that "few artists have quite such a disparity between their music and their public persona" as Capaldi, who, in song, is "a man utterly battered by a breakup". He called Capaldi's honesty "appealing" and felt that there is "some solid songwriting here, and a nobility to the sheer honesty of the lyrics", describing the music as "full-force, ugly crying pop". Roisin O'Connor of The Independent called Capaldi's voice "a gravelly powerhouse that manages to evoke the 22-year-old's natural charisma even on the weepiest of ballads" and said the album "alternates between piano and guitar-based tracks, with production that retains raw moments" that, while "not the most adventurous album [...] is more about unveiling the rough materials Capaldi has to work with". Hayley Milross from The Line of Best Fit called the album "an assured and settled debut", saying that while Capaldi may not have "deliver[ed] an album that leans towards the extraordinary", it is a "collection of poignant love songs that are honest and sincere".

Robin Murray of Clash questioned why Capaldi's music is "so boring" given his "hilarious" public persona. Murray judged that the album "isn't something anyone should hate. It's well produced, well played, and for the more part well written, if highly repetitive in its he said/she said subject matter", saying its "refusal to be disliked" is "perhaps its most dispiriting, irritating aspect". Writing for NME, Jordan Bassett characterised the album as "emotional piano ballads" that "sit at stark contrast with his public persona", concluding that it is "somewhat baffling that such a charismatic star could make a record so lacking in personality, though his fans won't mind one bit".

== Commercial performance ==
The album became the second fastest-selling album of the year in Ireland after three days of availability. The album started atop the Irish Albums Chart with 6,389 units (physical sales, downloads and streaming). It later became the fastest-selling album of the year, the decade and the fourth all-time in the country.

The album has reached over 10 million sales worldwide.

== Track listing ==
Divinely Uninspired to a Hellish Extent track listing
No.	Title	Writer(s)	Producer(s)	Length
1.	"Grace"	Lewis Capaldi; Nick Atkinson; Edd Holloway	Atkinson; Holloway	3:03
2.	"Bruises"	Capaldi; James Earp	Earp	3:38
3.	"Hold Me While You Wait"	Capaldi; Jamie N Commons; Jamie Hartman	Capaldi; Atkinson; Holloway; TMS	3:26
4.	"Someone You Loved"	Capaldi; Samuel Romans; Thomas Barnes; Peter Kelleher; Benjamin Kohn	TMS	3:02
5.	"Maybe"	Capaldi; Atkinson; Holloway	Atkinson; Holloway	3:30
6.	"Forever"	Capaldi; Joseph Janiak; Sean Douglas	Joe Janiak	3:30
7.	"One"	Capaldi; Phil Cook; Tom Mann	Phil Cook	2:59
8.	"Don't Get Me Wrong"	Capaldi; Hartman	Hartman; Atkinson^{[b]}; Holloway^{[b]}	3:33
9.	"Hollywood"	Capaldi; Callum Stewart; Philip Plested; Kane Parfitt	Capaldi; Atkinson; Holloway	3:11
10.	"Lost on You"	Capaldi; David Sneddon; Anu Pillai	Sneddon; Pillai	3:15
11.	"Fade"	Capaldi; James Ryan Ho	Malay	4:04
12.	"Headspace"	Capaldi	Capaldi; Atkinson; Holloway	5:06
Total length:				42:17

Extended edition bonus tracks
No.	Title	Writer(s)	Producer(s)	Length
13.	"Before You Go"	Capaldi; Barnes; Plested; Kelleher; Kohn	TMS	3:36
14.	"Leaving My Love Behind"	Capaldi; Andrew Frampton; Max Farrar	Andrew Frampton; Max Farrar	3:31
15.	"Let It Roll"	Capaldi; Atkinson; Holloway	Atkinson; Holloway	3:39
Total length:				53:03

Japan bonus tracks
No.	Title	Length
16.	"Someone You Loved" (live from Capitol Studio / 1 Mic 1 Take)	3:30
17.	"Bruises" (live orchestral version)	3:49
18.	"Bruises" (guitar acoustic)	3:47
Total length:		64:24

== Personnel ==
=== Vocals and production ===
- Lewis Capaldi – lead vocals, backing vocals, production
- Nicolas Atkinson – backing vocals
- TMS – production
- Nicolas Atkinson – production
- Edd Holloway – production
- James Earp – production
- Anu Pilai – production
- Malay Ho – production
- Phil Cook – production
- Joe Janiak – production
- Andrew Frampton – production

=== Technical ===
- Spike Stent – mixing
- Edd Holloway – mixing
- Mike Cave – mixing
- Robert Voseign – mastering
- Mike Cave – mastering
- Lewis Capaldi – executive producer
- Ryan Walter – executive producer

=== Artwork ===
- Alexandra Gavillet – photography
- Rory Dewar – art design
- Dan Sanders – art commission

== Charts ==
=== Weekly charts ===
Weekly chart performance for Divinely Uninspired to a Hellish Extent
Chart (2019–2025)	Peak position
Australian Albums (ARIA)	7
Austrian Albums (Ö3 Austria)	6
Belgian Albums (Ultratop Flanders)	6
Belgian Albums (Ultratop Wallonia)	54
Canadian Albums (Billboard)	5
Czech Albums (ČNS IFPI)	10
Danish Albums (Hitlisten)	5
Dutch Albums (Album Top 100)	10
Finnish Albums (Suomen virallinen lista)	17
French Albums (SNEP)	40
German Albums (Offizielle Top 100)	7
Irish Albums (IRMA)	1
Italian Albums (FIMI)	16
Japanese Hot Albums (Billboard Japan)	76
Japanese Albums (Oricon)	135
Latvian Albums (LAIPA)	7
New Zealand Albums (RMNZ)	3
Nigerian Albums (TurnTable)	65
Norwegian Albums (VG-lista)	1
Portuguese Albums (AFP)	96
Scottish Albums (OCC)	1
Spanish Albums (PROMUSICAE)	44
Swedish Albums (Sverigetopplistan)	7
Swiss Albums (Schweizer Hitparade)	3
UK Albums (OCC)	1
US Billboard 200	20

=== Year-end charts ===
Year-end chart performance for Divinely Uninspired to a Hellish Extent
Chart (2019)	Position
Australian Albums (ARIA)	41
Belgian Albums (Ultratop Flanders)	71
Canadian Albums (Billboard)	42
Danish Albums (Hitlisten)	34
Dutch Albums (Album Top 100)	62
French Albums (SNEP)	160
Icelandic Albums (Tónlistinn)	47
Irish Albums (IRMA)	1
New Zealand Albums (RMNZ)	34
Swedish Albums (Sverigetopplistan)	23
Swiss Albums (Schweizer Hitparade)	52
UK Albums (OCC)	1
US Billboard 200	136
Chart (2020)	Position
Australian Albums (ARIA)	18
Austrian Albums (Ö3 Austria)	45
Belgian Albums (Ultratop Flanders)	16
Belgian Albums (Ultratop Wallonia)	113
Canadian Albums (Billboard)	6
Danish Albums (Hitlisten)	10
Dutch Albums (Album Top 100)	12
French Albums (SNEP)	110
German Albums (Offizielle Top 100)	72
Icelandic Albums (Tónlistinn)	18
Irish Albums (IRMA)	2
Italian Albums (FIMI)	43
New Zealand Albums (RMNZ)	3
Swedish Albums (Sverigetopplistan)	10
Swiss Albums (Schweizer Hitparade)	33
UK Albums (OCC)	1
US Billboard 200	24
Chart (2021)	Position
Australian Albums (ARIA)	31
Austrian Albums (Ö3 Austria)	53
Belgian Albums (Ultratop Flanders)	33
Belgian Albums (Ultratop Wallonia)	193
Canadian Albums (Billboard)	20
Danish Albums (Hitlisten)	15
Dutch Albums (Album Top 100)	23
Icelandic Albums (Tónlistinn)	36
Irish Albums (IRMA)	12
Italian Albums (FIMI)	87
New Zealand Albums (RMNZ)	20
Norwegian Albums (VG-lista)	8
Swedish Albums (Sverigetopplistan)	29
UK Albums (OCC)	16
US Billboard 200	65
Chart (2022)	Position
Australian Albums (ARIA)	39
Belgian Albums (Ultratop Flanders)	39
Canadian Albums (Billboard)	39
Danish Albums (Hitlisten)	30
Dutch Albums (Album Top 100)	29
Icelandic Albums (Tónlistinn)	34
Lithuanian Albums (AGATA)	66
New Zealand Albums (RMNZ)	31
Swedish Albums (Sverigetopplistan)	56
UK Albums (OCC)	19
US Billboard 200	120
Chart (2023)	Position
Australian Albums (ARIA)	41
Austrian Albums (Ö3 Austria)	61
Belgian Albums (Ultratop Flanders)	30
Belgian Albums (Ultratop Wallonia)	137
Canadian Albums (Billboard)	44
Danish Albums (Hitlisten)	20
Dutch Albums (Album Top 100)	19
Icelandic Albums (Tónlistinn)	44
Italian Albums (FIMI)	94
New Zealand Albums (RMNZ)	36
Swedish Albums (Sverigetopplistan)	27
Swiss Albums (Schweizer Hitparade)	35
UK Albums (OCC)	17
US Billboard 200	161
Chart (2024)	Position
Australian Albums (ARIA)	73
Belgian Albums (Ultratop Flanders)	31
Belgian Albums (Ultratop Wallonia)	149
Danish Albums (Hitlisten)	42
Dutch Albums (Album Top 100)	25
Swedish Albums (Sverigetopplistan)	48
Swiss Albums (Schweizer Hitparade)	47
UK Albums (OCC)	48
Chart (2025)	Position
Belgian Albums (Ultratop Flanders)	58
Dutch Albums (Album Top 100)	69
Swedish Albums (Sverigetopplistan)	90
Swiss Albums (Schweizer Hitparade)	89
UK Albums (OCC)	63

== Certifications ==
Certifications for Divinely Uninspired to a Hellish Extent
Region	Certification	Certified units/sales
Australia (ARIA)	Platinum	70,000^{‡}
Austria (IFPI Austria)	2× Platinum	30,000^{‡}
Canada (Music Canada)	6× Platinum	480,000^{‡}
Denmark (IFPI Danmark)	3× Platinum	60,000^{‡}
France (SNEP)	2× Platinum	200,000^{‡}
Germany (BVMI)	Gold	100,000^{‡}
Italy (FIMI)	2× Platinum	100,000^{‡}
Netherlands (NVPI)	Gold	20,000^{‡}
New Zealand (RMNZ)	7× Platinum	105,000^{‡}
Norway (IFPI Norway)	4× Platinum	80,000^{‡}
Poland (ZPAV)	3× Platinum	60,000^{‡}
Portugal (AFP)	Gold	3,500^{‡}
Singapore (RIAS)	2× Platinum	20,000^{*}
Sweden (GLF)	2× Platinum	60,000^{‡}
United Kingdom (BPI)	6× Platinum	1,800,000^{‡}
^{*} Sales figures based on certification alone.^{‡} Sales+streaming figures based on certification alone.

== See also ==
- List of best-selling singles and albums of 2019 in Ireland
