= Charity Anderson =

American dancer (born 2000)

- Born: 2000 (age 25–26); Springville, Utah, U.S.
- Education: Springville High School
- Career
- Dances: Contemporary, acro, ballroom

Charity Anderson Reid (born 2000) is an American dancer. She specializes in contemporary and acro dance. She and partner Andres Peñate competed on season 2 of World of Dance in 2018, becoming the first in the show's history to score a perfect 100 on a routine.

== Early life and family ==
Charity Anderson was born and raised in Springville, Utah. She is the daughter of Wylie and Tresa Anderson and has nine brothers and sisters. She is a member of The Church of Jesus Christ of Latter-Day Saints. Her mother studied dance at Brigham Young University and opened a small dance studio in her home in 1996. As of 2014, her mother's Charisma Dance Studio employed 14 instructors and had 300 students. Charity and five of her 10 siblings dance competitively.

Charity graduated from Springville High School in 2018.

== Dancing career ==
From the ages of 8 to 12, Anderson competed in ballroom dance with same-age partner Andres Peñate; the pair won the title of National Preteen Champions. She has also danced competitively with her older brother Landon; the duo won both the 2019 and 2020 United States National Amateur Cabaret Championships. She trained at her mother's studio (Charisma Studio in Springville UT) where she currently teaches and choreographs.

=== World of Dance ===
[I]t was our own choreography and we had to come up with something fresh and new — something that people hadn't seen before.

–Anderson on Charity & Andre's dance routines for World of Dance

After watching season 1 of World of Dance, Anderson asked Peñate, who also trains at her dance studio, to partner with her in contemporary dance for season 2. It would be their last opportunity to compete in the junior division, as both were still 17. The pair, billed as Charity & Andres, choreographed their own routines, taking advantage of each other's athleticism and knowledge of "dance tricks". They scored 95.3 in the Qualifying round and received a perfect 100 in the second Duels round. This was the first perfect score in the show's history. Their dance, set to the rock hit "Way Down We Go" by Kaleo, included Anderson performing a blind jump onto Penate's back. The pair won the junior division with a score of 93, though Anderson had broken her toe during practice a few days before that dance. They finished third in the finals with a combined average score of 94.3.

Charity & Andres participated in the World of Dance fall tour in 2018. In April 2019, Anderson was one of seven dancers selected to back Derek Hough on his first solo tour. In August 2019, Charity & Andres choreographed and performed a special "farewell dance" for The Piano Guys' cover of Lewis Capaldi's "Someone You Loved". As of January 6, 2021, this video had received over 11 million views.

== Personal life ==
On October 3, 2020, Anderson married Collin Reid.
