= Shit Kingz =

Japanese dance troupe

- Origin: Tokyo, Japan
- Years active: 2007-present
- Members: Shoji; Kazuki; Noppo; Oguri
- Website: shitkingz.jp

Shit Kingz (シットキングス, Shitto Kingusu; stylized as s**t kingz), also known as ST Kingz, is a Japanese dance and performance troupe who have also choreographed dances for multiple Japanese and South Korean artists.

== Career ==
Shit Kingz first performed together in October 2007, as Daichi Miura's back-up dancers. The group name originated from the word "incontinence" (失禁, shikkin), which the members had intended as a hyperbole of having their audience "pee themselves" from the shock of seeing their performance; however, as the word is considered profanity in Japanese, they opted to use a word from a different language that would express a similar meaning. In 2010, several members performed as back-up dancers in BoA's Christmas concert. From 2010 to 2011, they were winners of the American dance contest, Body Rock, for two years in a row. Over the course of their career, they have choreographed for Japanese and South Korean artists including AAA, Winds, Daichi Miura, various groups from Johnny & Associates, TVXQ, Shinee, and Exo.

In 2016, Shit Kingz performed in their self-produced stage play Wonderful Clunker, to which Daichi Miura performed on the soundtrack. In 2018, they performed their stage play, The Library, with 30 shows in seven locations. They released their first album of the same name independently on December 7, 2018, with music produced by them. In 2019, they choreographed the dance in the ending sequence of the anime Business Fish.

== Filmography ==
=== Television ===
Year	Title	Role	Network	Notes
2011	Dance@TV	Themselves	TV Tokyo	
2017	Mecha-Mecha Iketeru!	Themselves	Fuji TV	
2018	Sukkiri	Themselves	Nippon TV	
2018	World of Dance	Themselves	NBC	Competition reality show; season 2 contestants

=== Theatre ===
Year	Title	Role	Notes
2016	Wonderful Clunker	Themselves	
2018	The Library	Themselves	

=== Anime ===
Year	Title	Role	Notes
2019	Business Fish	Choreography	Ending sequence

=== Choreography credits ===
Year	Artist	Song	Notes
2012	Da-ice	"Stand"	Shoji
2013	Hey! Say! JUMP	"Ride with Me"	
2014	Da-ice	"Toki"	Noppo
2014	Super Junior-D&E	"Skeleton"	
2015	Da-ice	"Mou Ichido Dake"	Kazuki
2015	B1A4	"Happy Days"	
2015	Exo	"Love Me Right"	
2015	Cross Gene	"Shi-tai!"	
2016	Da-ice	"Every Season"	Oguri
2016	Shinee	"D×D×D"	
2016	Nissy	"Mada Kimi wa Shiranai My Prettiest Girl"	Kazuki
2016	Da-ice	"Paradive"	
2016	Da-ice	"Date"	Oguri
2016	NCT U	"The 7th Sense"	
2016	Exo	"Lotto"	
2017	Jasmine	"Halo"	
2018	Da-ice	"Bet"	Oguri
2026	NCT WISH	"Hello Mellow"	

== Discography ==
=== Albums ===
Title	Details	Peak chart positions	Sales
Title	Details	JPN	Sales
The Library	Released: December 7, 2018; Label: —; Format: CD	—	
