= Toho Animation Studio =

Japanese animation studio

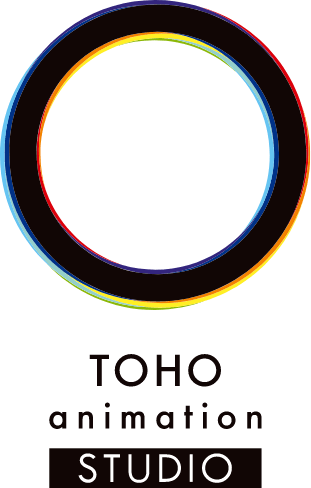

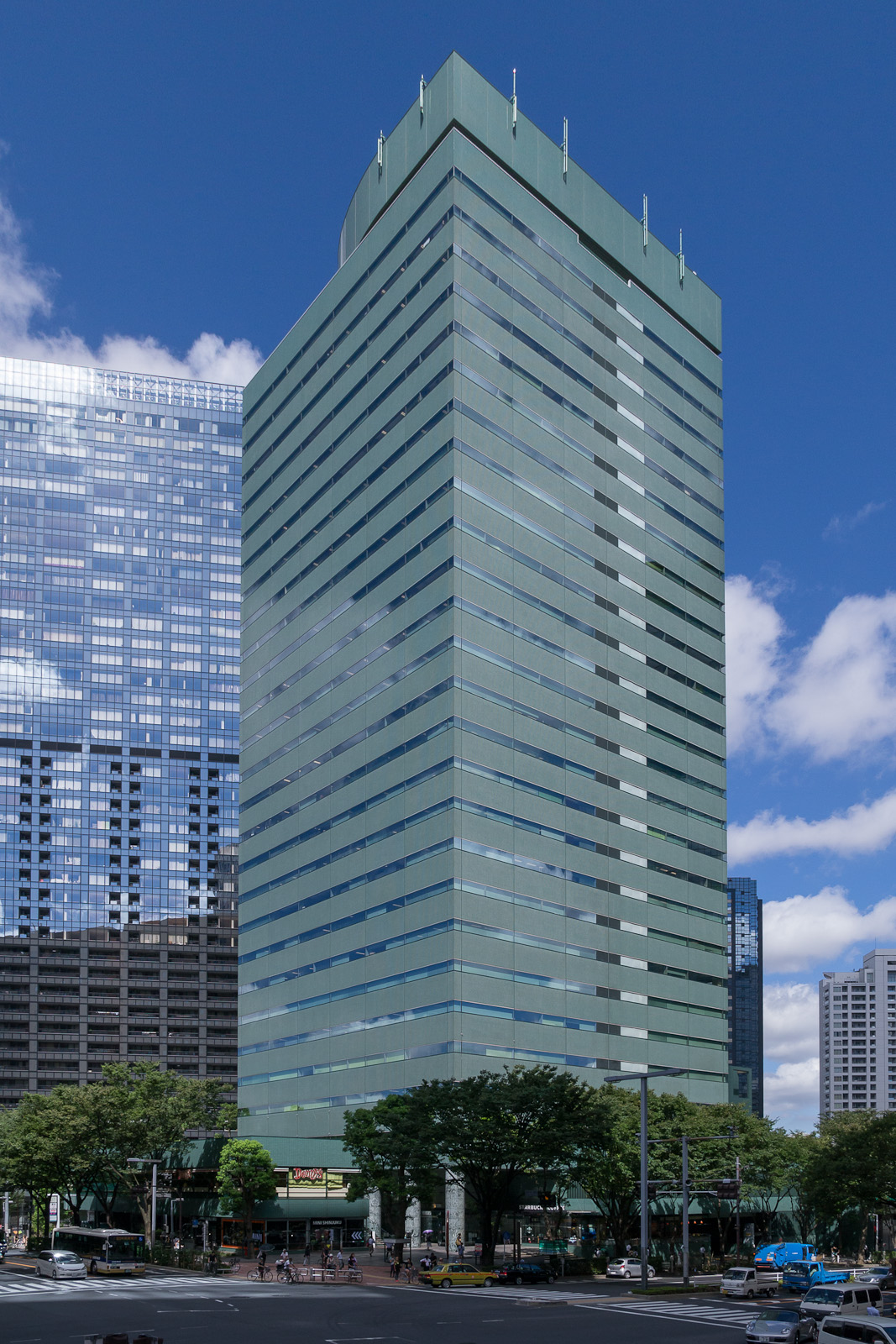
- Headquarters in Shinjuku, Tokyo
- Native name: 株式会社TOHO animation STUDIO
- Romanized name: Kabushiki-gaisha TOHO animation STUDIO
- Formerly: IANDA Co., Ltd. (2017-2019); TIA Inc. (2019-2022)
- Type: Joint venture
- Industry: Animation studio
- Founded: August 2, 2017; 9 years ago
- Headquarters: Nishi-Shinjuku, Shinjuku, Tokyo, Japan
- Owner: Toho (67.4%); ILCA (32.6%)
- Number of employees: 34 (as of February 2026)
- Website: ta-studio.co.jp

Toho Animation Studio (Note: 株式会社TOHO animation STUDIO, Kabushiki-gaisha TOHO animation STUDIO), stylized as TOHO animation STUDIO, is a Japanese animation studio based in Shinjuku, Tokyo, founded in 2017 as IANDA, a joint-venture between developer and publisher ILCA with animation studio Anima. In 2019, the company rebranded to TIA after film and television studio Toho acquired a equity stake in the studio. Toho would acquire a controlling stake in the studio on September 20, 2022, rebranding to its current name.

== Works ==
=== Television series ===
Title	Director(s)	First run start date	First run end date	Eps	Note(s)	Ref.
Business Fish	Takashi Sumida	July 7, 2019	August 11, 2019	12	Based on a character created by Quan.	
Iii Icecrin	Juria Matsumuda	April 6, 2021	December 21, 2021	12	Original work. Co-produced with Shin-Ei Animation.	
Iii Icecrin (season 2)	Juria Matsumuda	July 2, 2022	September 17, 2022	12	Second season of Iii Icecrin.	
The Apothecary Diaries	Norihiro Naganuma	October 22, 2023	March 24, 2024	24	Based on a light novel by Hyūganatsu. Co-produced with OLM.	
Puniru Is a Cute Slime	Yūshi Ibe	October 6, 2024	December 23, 2024	12	Based on a manga by Maeda-kun.	
The Apothecary Diaries (season 2)	Norihiro Naganuma (chief); Akinori Fudesaka	January 10, 2025	July 4, 2025	24	Second season of The Apothecary Diaries. Co-produced with OLM.	
Puniru Is a Cute Slime (season 2)	Yūshi Ibe	July 6, 2025	September 21, 2025	12	Second season of Puniru Is a Cute Slime.	
Phantom Busters	Chika Nagaoka	2027	TBA	TBA	Based on a manga by Neoshoco.	

=== Films ===
Title	Director(s)	Release date	Note(s)	Ref.
100 Nichikan Ikita Wani	Shinichiro Ueda; Miyuki Fukuda	July 9, 2021	Based on the web manga 100 Nichi Go ni Shinu Wani by Yuuki Kikuchi.	
Godzilla vs Megalon	Takuya Kaminishi and Akihiro Shibata	2023	Debuted at "Godzilla Fest 2023"	
Knot (結び)	Ryotaro Hirase	2024		
Firstline (ファーストライン)	China Sui (ﾁﾅ•ｽｨ)	2024	Music by Hayato Sumino	
Frail (フレイル)	Mabuta Motoki	2024		
The Apothecary Diaries: The Late Lady's Treasure	Norihiro Naganuma	December 11, 2026	Original work based on a light novel by Hyūganatsu.	
