= Something Borrowed (Demo) =

Demo by Lewis Capaldi

from the EP Breach
- Released: 8 November 2018
- Length: 3:15
- Label: Virgin
- Songwriters: Lewis Capaldi; David Sneddon; Anu Pillai
- Producer: Freeform Five

"Something Borrowed" is a demo song by Scottish singer-songwriter Lewis Capaldi. It was released as a track on 8 November 2018 via Virgin Records from his second extended play Breach, which was released on that day. The song is certified Silver in the United Kingdom.

== Reception ==
Kathryn O'Leary of Ones to Watch said, "The demo for 'Something Borrowed' is a gospel-influenced tune to try and pull you out of the despair 'Someone You Loved' left you in. With the background vocals acting as a church choir and use of the organ, Capaldi is accepting the love coming his way."

== Certifications ==
Certifications for "Something Borrowed"
Region	Certification	Certified units/sales
United Kingdom (BPI)	Silver	200,000^{‡}
^{‡} Sales+streaming figures based on certification alone.
