= 100 Nichi Go ni Shinu Wani =

Japanese web manga series

100日後に死ぬワニ (Hyaku Nichi Go ni Shinu Wani)
- Genre: Slice of life
- Manga
- Written by: Yuuki Kikuchi
- Published by: Shogakukan
- Imprint: Gessan Shōnen Sunday Comics
- Original run: December 12, 2019 – March 20, 2020
- Volumes: 1
- Anime film

100 Nichikan Ikita Wani
- Directed by: Shinichiro Ueda
- Written by: Miyuki Fukuda
- Music by: Seiji Kameda
- Studio: TIA
- Released: July 9, 2021
- Manga

100 Nichi Go ni Shinu (X) Nezumi
- Written by: Yuuki Kikuchi
- Published by: Futabasha
- Imprint: Action Comics
- Original run: August 21, 2024 – November 29, 2024
- Volumes: 1

100 Nichi Go ni Shinu Wani (100日後に死ぬワニ; "A Crocodile Who Will Die in 100 Days") is a Japanese web manga series written and illustrated by Yuuki Kikuchi. It is also well known as the abbreviated "100 Wani". The series, which depicts an anthropomorphic crocodile's last 100 days before his death, was self-published on Twitter between December 2019 and March 2020. A single tankōbon volume was published by Shougakukan in April 2020. An anime film adaptation produced by TIA, titled 100 Nichikan Ikita Wani (100日間生きたワニ; "A Crocodile Who Lived For 100 Days"), was scheduled to be released in May 2021, but was delayed to July 2021, due to the COVID-19 pandemic.

== Overview ==
The story of 100 Nichi Go ni Shinu Wani follows the everyday life of the main character, Crocodile, a Japanese anthropomorphic male crocodile, consisting largely of socializing with his acquaintances, such as his best friend Mouse, and love interest. Unbeknownst to Crocodile, He will die in 100 days from the first issue of the manga, with each issue depicting a day of Crocodile's life. The number of days until Crocodile's death is made known to the reader through a text banner following every issue of the manga displaying the number of days until Crocodile's death and subsequently the final issue of the manga. The story is linked to the time of year during which it is serialized, and cultural events such as New Year's Day are also reflected in the story. In the 100th and final issue of the manga, serialized March 20, 2020, during Japanese cherry blossom season, the cause of Crocodile's inevitable death is implied: On the way to meet his friends to admire the cherry blossoms, Crocodile is fatally struck by a vehicle while helping a chick safely cross a road in a final act of good-samaritanism.

Following the serialization of the manga's final issue, Taiwanese media outlet 4Gamers and others posited that the ending of this work may be related to the accidental death of a friend of Kikuchi's that was previously mentioned on his website. Kikuchi revealed during a livestream on March 21, 2020, the day after the serialization of the final issue, that it was indeed one of the triggers for creating the work, and said that his intention was "to convey a message to cherish the limited time we have, since you never know what might happen". According to Kikuchi, none of the characters in the work are modeled after specific individuals; rather, they are creations mixed from people he has met and experiences he has had.

In an interview with Oricon News, the author Yuuki Kikuchi states his motivation for creating the manga as follows:

We will all die someday. To be alive is to die someday. If we are conscious of our own "end" and the "end" of those around us, perhaps our actions and way of life will move in a better direction. I hope that the crocodile will be an opportunity to think about these things.

== Media ==
=== Manga ===
Written and illustrated by Yuuki Kikuchi, 100 Nichi Go ni Shinu Wani was published on the author's Twitter account from December 12, 2019, to March 20, 2020. The 100 days of the crocodile's life are counted down by four panels (13 panels in the final chapter, including the large panel) per day. The manga garnered over 300,000 likes per post, and was the number one trending topic on X (formerly known as Twitter) in the world on March 20, 2020, the day the series ended. A single tankōbon volume was published by Shougakukan on April 8, 2020. A sequel manga titled 100 Nichi Go ni Shinu (X) Nezumi was serialized on the same Twitter account from August 21 to November 29, 2024. A single tankōbon volume was published by Futabasha on December 18, 2024.

=== Film ===
An anime film adaptation produced by TIA, titled 100 Nichikan Ikita Wani (100日間生きたワニ; "A Crocodile Who Lived For 100 Days"), was scheduled to be released on May 28, 2021, but was delayed to July 9, 2021, due to the COVID-19 pandemic.

== Reception ==
The manga was ranked 28th in Kadokawa Corporation's Da Vinci magazine's "Book of the Year" list in 2020.
