= Someone You Loved =

Single by Lewis Capaldi

from the EP Breach and the album Divinely Uninspired to a Hellish Extent
- Released: November 8, 2018
- Genre: Pop; soul
- Length: 3:02
- Label: Vertigo
- Songwriters: Dennis Spencer; Samuel Romans; Thomas Barnes; Peter Kelleher; Benjamin Kohn
- Producer: TMS

Lewis Capaldi singles chronology
"Grace" (2018)	"Someone You Loved" (2018)	"Hold Me While You Wait" (2019)

Music videos
- "Someone You Loved" (first version) on YouTube
- "Someone You Loved" (second version) on YouTube

"Someone You Loved" is a song by Scottish singer-songwriter Lewis Capaldi. It was released on November 8, 2018 via digital download through Vertigo Records, as the third single from his second extended play, Breach (2018). The song was later included on his debut studio album, Divinely Uninspired to a Hellish Extent (2019). It was written by Capaldi, Samuel Romans, and its producers Thomas Barnes, Peter Kelleher and Benjamin Kohn. The song was sent to radio stations on April 16, 2019 as the album's first single in the United States.

"Someone You Loved" was a commercial success, peaking at No. 1 on the UK Singles Chart. The song became Capaldi's first No. 1 single, spending seven consecutive weeks atop the chart and was the best selling single of 2019 in the UK. It also peaked at No. 1 on the Irish Singles Chart, the Canadian Hot 100, and the Recording Industry Association of Malaysia singles chart. In the United States, "Someone You Loved" was a sleeper hit, topping the Billboard Hot 100 in its 24th week on the chart. The song is certified Diamond or higher in Australia, Brazil, Canada, France, Germany, Poland, Philippines, Thailand, and the United States. It was nominated for Song of the Year at the 62nd Grammy Awards. It also received an award for Song of the Year at the 2020 Brit Awards. In early August 2025, on the streaming app Spotify, the song became the fourth song to reach 4 billion streams on the app.

== Background and composition ==
"Someone You Loved" is played in the tempo of 110 BPM and key signature of D♭ major. In an interview with the French magazine Brut, Capaldi revealed he wrote the song about his grandmother who had died.

In an interview with the British website NME, Capaldi said that it took him six months to write the song. He said, "A lot of people say that 'the best songs fall into your lap' and that they're the easiest ones to write and take the shortest amount of time: I wholeheartedly disagree with that. I think my best songs come from me sitting at a piano, bashing my head against a brick wall for hours and hours on end to get one good melody."

== Critical reception ==
Reviewer Dave Simpson of The Guardian gave the song four stars out of five, calling it and its heartbreak theme "raw and real."

== Music videos ==
The first music video was published on 28 February 2019 in partnership with an organ donation charity, Live Life Give Life. This music video featured Capaldi's distant relative (second cousin once removed), (Note: Peter's paternal great-grandfather is Lewis' paternal great-great-grandfather) actor Peter Capaldi as a bereaved husband who finds some joy when he visits the family of the woman his wife donated her heart to, and is able to listen to her heartbeat one last time.

The second music video, featuring the singer himself, was released on 29 August 2019. In the start, Capaldi wanders the streets, following his lost love as his friends and strangers try to stop him from chasing after her. His brother, Aidan, also made an appearance at the beginning of the video where he pulls Lewis from the bench. The director of the music video, Ozzie Pullin, said:

The first person Lewis encounters is his brother, who pulls him up from the bench. This was an almost perfect metaphor because family members are usually the first people to push you forward.

Capaldi said:

For me the video is about the people we surround ourselves with that have the strength when we don't and help us continue to make the right decisions in moments of fear or hardship. In the moment we often choose to ignore friends and family, thinking our judgement is better, but of course in hindsight when you're in that headspace it's almost impossible to make the right decisions.

== Chart performance ==
"Someone You Loved" reached No. 1 on the UK Singles Chart and stayed there for seven consecutive weeks. It is also Capaldi's first entry on the US Billboard Hot 100, debuting at No. 85 on the issue dated 25 May 2019 and becoming the singer's first number-one single in the country on the issue dated 2 November 2019. It reached No. 1 after 24 weeks on the chart, becoming one of the longest climbs to the top position in Billboard history. After three non-consecutive weeks on top it was replaced by Post Malone's "Circles".

In Ireland, the single cumulated 26.8 million streams in 2019 and was the biggest-selling song in the country that year.

== Track listing ==
- Digital download
1. "Someone You Loved" – 3:02
- Digital download
1. "Someone You Loved" (Future Humans Remix) – 3:09
- Digital download
1. "Someone You Loved" (Madism Radio Mix)– 2:37
- CD single
1. "Someone You Loved" – 3:02
2. "Someone You Loved" (Madism Radio Mix) – 2:37
3. "Someone You Loved" (Instrumental) – 3:02
4. "Voice Note From Lewis"

== Personnel ==
- TMS – production, mixing
- Phil Cook – strings
- Lewis Capaldi – vocals, piano
- Robert Voseign – mastering
- Ryan Walter – artwork design
- Ali Gavillet – photography

== Charts ==
=== Weekly charts ===
Weekly chart performance for "Someone You Loved"
Chart (2018–2024)	Peak position
Argentina Hot 100 (Billboard)	79
Australia (ARIA)	4
Austria (Ö3 Austria Top 40)	8
Belgium (Ultratop 50 Flanders)	2
Belgium (Ultratop 50 Wallonia)	2
Brazil (Top 100 Brasil)	55
Canada Hot 100 (Billboard)	1
Canada AC (Billboard)	1
Canada CHR/Top 40 (Billboard)	1
Canada Hot AC (Billboard)	1
CIS Airplay (TopHit)	114
Colombia (National-Report)	62
Czech Republic Airplay (ČNS IFPI)	1
Czech Republic Singles Digital (ČNS IFPI)	5
Denmark (Tracklisten)	7
Finland (Suomen virallinen lista)	12
France (SNEP)	20
Germany (GfK)	18
Global 200 (Billboard)	24
Greece (IFPI Greece)	3
Hungary (Rádiós Top 40)	35
Hungary (Single Top 40)	19
Hungary (Stream Top 40)	11
Ireland (IRMA)	1
Italy (FIMI)	5
Latvia (LAIPA)	10
Malaysia (RIM)	1
Netherlands (Dutch Top 40)	7
Netherlands (Single Top 100)	8
New Zealand (Recorded Music NZ)	4
Norway (VG-lista)	3
Poland Airplay (ZPAV)	25
Portugal (AFP)	8
Romania (Airplay 100)	11
San Marino (SMRRTV Top 50)	39
Scottish Singles Sales (Official Charts)	1
Singapore (RIAS)	4
Slovakia Airplay (ČNS IFPI)	8
Slovakia Singles Digital (ČNS IFPI)	8
Slovenia (SloTop50)	7
South Africa (RISA)	74
Spain (Promusicae)	45
Sweden (Sverigetopplistan)	6
Switzerland (Schweizer Hitparade)	3
Ukraine Airplay (TopHit)	19
UK Singles (Official Charts)	1
US Billboard Hot 100	1
US Adult Alternative Airplay (Billboard)	30
US Adult Contemporary (Billboard)	1
US Adult Pop Airplay (Billboard)	1
US Dance Airplay (Billboard)	2
US Pop Airplay (Billboard)	1
US Rolling Stone Top 100	5

=== Year-end charts ===
2019 year-end chart performance for "Someone You Loved"
Chart (2019)	Position
Australia (ARIA)	5
Austria (Ö3 Austria Top 40)	6
Belgium (Ultratop Flanders)	1
Belgium (Ultratop Wallonia)	3
Canada (Canadian Hot 100)	19
Denmark (Tracklisten)	6
France (SNEP)	40
Germany (Official German Charts)	12
Hungary (Single Top 40)	80
Iceland (Tónlistinn)	11
Ireland (IRMA)	1
Italy (FIMI)	18
Latvia (LAIPA)	11
Malaysia (RIM)	2
Netherlands (Dutch Top 40)	6
Netherlands (Single Top 100)	7
New Zealand (Recorded Music NZ)	5
Portugal (AFP)	16
Romania (Airplay 100)	74
Slovenia (SloTop50)	12
Sweden (Sverigetopplistan)	7
Switzerland (Schweizer Hitparade)	3
UK Singles (OCC)	1
US Billboard Hot 100	27
US Adult Contemporary (Billboard)	17
US Adult Top 40 (Billboard)	9
US Dance/Mix Show Airplay (Billboard)	23
US Mainstream Top 40 (Billboard)	19
US Rolling Stone Top 100	16

2020 year-end chart performance for "Someone You Loved"
Chart (2020)	Position
Australia (ARIA)	13
Austria (Ö3 Austria Top 40)	32
Belgium (Ultratop Flanders)	42
Brazil Airplay (Crowley)	81
Canada (Canadian Hot 100)	10
Denmark (Tracklisten)	7
France (SNEP)	75
Germany (Official German Charts)	36
Hungary (Stream Top 40)	59
Ireland (IRMA)	11
Italy (FIMI)	57
Netherlands (Single Top 100)	20
New Zealand (Recorded Music NZ)	17
Romania (Airplay 100)	60
Spain (PROMUSICAE)	95
Sweden (Sverigetopplistan)	12
Switzerland (Schweizer Hitparade)	10
UK Singles (OCC)	8
US Billboard Hot 100	10
US Adult Contemporary (Billboard)	2
US Adult Top 40 (Billboard)	8
US Mainstream Top 40 (Billboard)	21

2021 year-end chart performance for "Someone You Loved"
Chart (2021)	Position
Australia (ARIA)	29
Brazil Streaming (Pro-Música Brasil)	171
Denmark (Tracklisten)	39
France (SNEP)	165
Global 200 (Billboard)	28
Ireland (IRMA)	43
Portugal (AFP)	61
Sweden (Sverigetopplistan)	77
Switzerland (Schweizer Hitparade)	50
UK Singles (OCC)	30
Ukraine Airplay (Tophit)	45

2022 year-end chart performance for "Someone You Loved"
Chart (2022)	Position
Australia (ARIA)	48
Denmark (Tracklisten)	84
Global 200 (Billboard)	54
UK Singles (OCC)	53
Ukraine Airplay (TopHit)	157

2023 year-end chart performance for "Someone You Loved"
Chart (2023)	Position
Australia (ARIA)	30
Denmark (Tracklisten)	67
Global 200 (Billboard)	49
Netherlands (Single Top 100)	54
New Zealand (Recorded Music NZ)	37
Switzerland (Schweizer Hitparade)	20
UK Singles (OCC)	27

2024 year-end chart performance for "Someone You Loved"
Chart (2024)	Position
Australia (ARIA)	56
France (SNEP)	134
Global 200 (Billboard)	46
Netherlands (Single Top 100)	77
Portugal (AFP)	135
Switzerland (Schweizer Hitparade)	32
UK Singles (OCC)	53

2025 year-end chart performance for "Someone You Loved"
Chart (2025)	Position
Global 200 (Billboard)	78
Switzerland (Schweizer Hitparade)	67
UK Singles (OCC)	72

=== Decade-end charts ===
Decade-end chart performance for "Someone You Loved"
Chart (2010–2019)	Position
UK Singles (Official Charts Company)	24

== Certifications ==
Certifications for "Someone You Loved"
Region	Certification	Certified units/sales
Australia (ARIA)	23× Platinum	1,610,000^{‡}
Austria (IFPI Austria)	6× Platinum	180,000^{‡}
Belgium (BRMA)	4× Platinum	160,000^{‡}
Brazil (Pro-Música Brasil)	9× Diamond	1,440,000^{‡}
Canada (Music Canada)	2× Diamond	1,600,000^{‡}
Denmark (IFPI Danmark)	7× Platinum	630,000^{‡}
France (SNEP)	Diamond	333,333^{‡}
Germany (BVMI)	Diamond	1,000,000^{‡}
Italy (FIMI)	6× Platinum	600,000^{‡}
Netherlands (NVPI)	2× Platinum	160,000^{‡}
New Zealand (RMNZ)	12× Platinum	360,000^{‡}
Norway (IFPI Norway)	Platinum	60,000^{‡}
Poland (ZPAV)	Diamond	250,000^{‡}
Portugal (AFP)	7× Platinum	70,000^{‡}
Spain (Promusicae)	6× Platinum	360,000^{‡}
United Kingdom (BPI)	11× Platinum	6,600,000^{‡}
United States (RIAA)	Diamond	10,000,000^{‡}
Streaming
Greece (IFPI Greece)	Platinum	2,000,000^{†}
Sweden (GLF)	3× Platinum	24,000,000^{†}
^{‡} Sales+streaming figures based on certification alone.^{†} Streaming-only figures based on certification alone.

== Release history ==
Release history for "Someone You Loved"
Country	Date	Format	Label	Ref.
United Kingdom	8 November 2018	Digital download; streaming	Virgin	
United States	16 April 2019	Contemporary hit radio	Vertigo; Virgin	

== Cover versions ==
- The Piano Guys covered the song in a piano and cello composition on their video featuring World of Dance season 2 contestants Charity Anderson and Andres Penate.
- Nicola Roberts performed the song in her Queen Bee disguise on the first series of The Masked Singer UK.
- Camila Cabello and the Jonas Brothers covered the song during BBC Radio 1's Live Lounge, while Bastille, Charlie Puth, and Alec Benjamin covered the song for SiriusXM.
- Capaldi performed the song as a surprise guest with Nina Nesbitt and James Bay at their concerts, and with Alicia Keys at the 2019 iHeartRadio Music Festival.
- Conor Maynard covered the song in September 2019.
- Chris Daughtry covered the song during the second season of The Masked Singer and would later perform it during the 2020 pandemic "Live from Home" tour
- Australian sibling duo Angus & Julia Stone released a cover of the song in 2024 for Triple J's Like a Version.
- In 2026, Italian composer Giacomo Bucci included an orchestral arrangement of "Someone You Loved" on Mainstream Overtures, his album of orchestral reinterpretations released on 6 March 2026.

== See also ==
- List of best-selling singles in Australia
- List of best-selling singles and albums of 2019 in Ireland
- List of highest-certified digital singles in the United States
- List of Billboard Hot 100 number-one singles of 2019
- List of Canadian Hot 100 number-one singles of 2019
- List of number-one singles of 2019 (Ireland)
- List of number-one songs of 2019 (Malaysia)
- List of UK Singles Chart number ones of the 2010s
- List of Billboard Adult Contemporary number ones of 2019 and 2020 (U.S.)
