= Lost on You (Lewis Capaldi song) =

Single by Lewis Capaldi

from the EP Bloom and the album Divinely Uninspired to a Hellish Extent
- Released: 7 July 2017
- Length: 3:15
- Label: Virgin
- Songwriters: Capaldi; David Sneddon; Anu Pillai

Lewis Capaldi singles chronology
"Bruises" (2017)	"Lost on You" (2017)	"Fade" (2017)

"Lost on You" is a song by Scottish singer-songwriter Lewis Capaldi. It was released as a digital download on 7 July 2017 via Virgin Records as the second single from his debut extended play Bloom and his debut studio album Divinely Uninspired to a Hellish Extent. The song peaked at number 50 on the Scottish Singles Chart.

== Charts ==
Chart performance for "Lost on You"
Chart (2017)	Peak position
Scotland Singles (OCC)	50

== Certifications ==
Certifications for "Lost on You"
Region	Certification	Certified units/sales
Australia (ARIA)	Gold	35,000^{‡}
Canada (Music Canada)	Gold	40,000^{‡}
New Zealand (RMNZ)	Gold	15,000^{‡}
United Kingdom (BPI)	Platinum	600,000^{‡}
^{‡} Sales+streaming figures based on certification alone.

== Release history ==
Release history and formats for "Lost on You"
Region	Date	Format	Label
United Kingdom	7 July 2017	Digital download; streaming	Virgin
