= Business Fish =

Fictional character

ビジネスフィッシュ
- Anime television series
- Directed by: Takashi Sumida
- Written by: Ohkura
- Studio: Ianda
- Original network: Tokyo MX, BS11, Hulu
- Original run: July 7, 2019 – August 11, 2019
- Episodes: 12

Business Fish (ビジネスフィッシュ, Bijinesu Fisshu) is a fictional character created by Yuichiro Ohno and produced by the Japanese company Quan, Inc. Featuring a salaryman with the head of a fish, the character has been featured in a web comic series by Quan, Inc., as well as being known for its stickers on Facebook and Line. A 3D motion-capture anime series aired on Tokyo MX from July 7 to August 11, 2019.

== Background and creation ==
Business Fish was created by Yuichiro Ohno and published by Quan, Inc. Ohno posted several web comics with Quan, Inc. featuring Business Fish. A sticker sets featuring the character were released in 2015 on Facebook and Line. The Facebook sticker set was downloaded 250,000,000 times worldwide.

== Characters ==
The original creation concept and web comic focused on Business Fish, a white-collared salaryman who often skips work but uses his abilities to help people in need. Other characters who appeared in the web comic include Craig, (Note: The character's name is Craig (クレッグ, Kureggu) in Japanese, but the English version of the comic lists his name as "Colleague.") Business Fish's colleague; Chairman, Business Fish's best friend; Octopus CEO, the CEO of the company; Dog, Business Fish's pet dog; Manager, Business Fish's manager; Amuro, a colleague from the R&D section of the company; and Lady Fish, Business Fish's older sister.

=== Anime adaptation ===
Tai Uowaki (魚脇 タイ, Uowaki Tai)
Voiced by: Takuya Nagaoka
Tai is a salaryman with the head of a fish, working at Sea Vision. He feels inadequate about his life.
Mai Otohime (乙姫 舞, Otohime Mai)
Voiced by: Rena Takeda
Otohime is Tai's high school classmate who was popular when they were students. She and Tai begin dating.
Fudō Umino (海野 ぶどう, Umino Fudō)
Voiced by: Motoki Ochiai
Fudō is Tai's junior colleague, who Tai feels is irresponsible.
Hachio Takoyama (蛸山 八男, Takoyama Hachio)
Voiced by: Ryosuke Takei
Hachio is Tai's colleague and confidant.
Ebika Ise (伊勢 えびか, Ise Ebika)
Voiced by: Takemi Fujii
Ebika is Tai's colleague with the head of a shrimp.
Asase (浅瀬課長, Asase-kachō)
Voiced by: Hiroki Ōtsu
Asase is the chief of Tai's department.
Mosugu Isono (磯野 もずく, Isono Mosugu)
Voiced by: Yua Shiraishi
Mosugu is Tai's colleague.
Ika (IKAちゃん, Ika-chan)
Voiced by: Kenshō Ono
Ika is a fashionable employee of a café with the head of a squid.

== Media ==
=== Anime ===
In June 2019, Quan, Inc. announced that a joint partnership had been formed with Toho to create and distribute a 3D CG anime adaptation based on the original Business Fish character. The series began airing on Tokyo MX, BS11, and Hulu from July 7 to August 11, 2019. (Note: Tokyo MX lists the air date as July 7, 2019 at 24:00, which is July 8, 2019 at 12 AM.) The series is directed by Takashi Sumida, who created the drama Kakū OL Nikki, with animation provided by IANDA. The voice cast features a variety of Japanese actors, television personalities, and voice actors, who were selected out of 100 applicants and provided the motion capture for their characters. The ending theme song is "Don't Stop Moving" by Sarah Kelly, and the animation featured in the ending sequence was motion captured by dance group Shit Kingz.

==== Episode list ====
No.	Title	Written by	Original release date
1	"The Supporting Character Elite"; Transliteration: "Wakiyaku no Toppu" (Japanese: 脇役のトップ)	Unknown	July 7, 2019
2	"Tai-me to Break Up"; Transliteration: "Wakaretai" (Japanese: 別れタイ)	Unknown	July 7, 2019
Tai, who desperately wants to be seen as the main character instead of a supporting character, runs into Otohime, a popular classmate from his high school, and decides to ask her out as he consults Hachio for advice. However, his feelings of inadequacy get in the way of their relationship.
3	"Uowaki's Harassment"; Transliteration: "Uowaki no Harasumento" (Japanese: 魚脇のハラスメント)	Unknown	July 14, 2019
4	"Ika's Concerns"; Transliteration: "Ika-chan no Nayami" (Japanese: IKAちゃんの悩み)	Unknown	July 14, 2019
5	"Nobody Compliments Me, So I'm Not Complimenting Anyone"; Transliteration: "Ore ga Hito Kara Homerarenai no wa Dare no Koto mo Homenai Kara da" (Japanese: 俺が人から褒められないのは誰のことも褒めないからだ)	Unknown	July 21, 2019
6	"Tai-me To Call Me By My First Name!"; Transliteration: "Tai tte Yobaretai!" (Japanese: タイって呼ばれタイ！)	Unknown	July 21, 2019
7	"Chief Asase's Challenge"; Transliteration: "Asase-kachō no Chōsen" (Japanese: 浅瀬課長の挑戦)	Unknown	July 28, 2019
8	"What's Otohime's First Name?"; Transliteration: "Otohime-san no Na wa?" (Japanese: 乙姫さんの名は？)	Unknown	July 28, 2019
9	Transliteration: "Uowaki, Oyogase Oyogasare" (Japanese: 魚脇、泳がせ泳がされ)	Unknown	August 4, 2019
10	"Otohime and Tai's Relationship"; Transliteration: "Otohime-san to Tai na Kankei" (Japanese: 乙姫さんとタイな関係)	Unknown	August 4, 2019
11	"Tai Uowaki, Viral on Social Media!"; Transliteration: "Uowaki Tai, SNS de Dai Bazuri!" (Japanese: 魚脇タイ、SNSで大バズリ！)	Unknown	August 11, 2019
12	"Responsibility of the Lead Actor"; Transliteration: "Shuyaku no Sekinin" (Japanese: 主役の責任)	Unknown	August 11, 2019
