= Phantom Busters =

Japanese manga series

- First tankōbon volume cover, featuring Eugene Korekishi (left), Mogari Shishikuno (front), Kotaro Tamon (bottom), and Kaoru Kanzaki (right)

ファントムバスターズ (Fantomu Basutāzu)
- Genre: Comedy; Coming-of-age; Supernatural
- Manga
- Written by: Neoshoco
- Published by: Shueisha
- English publisher: NA: Viz Media
- Imprint: Jump Comics SQ.
- Magazine: Jump Square
- Original run: August 4, 2023 – present
- Volumes: 8
- Anime television series
- Directed by: Chika Nagaoka
- Studio: Toho Animation Studio
- Original run: 2027 – scheduled
- icon

Phantom Busters (Japanese: ファントムバスターズ, Hepburn: Fantomu Basutāzu) is a Japanese manga series written and illustrated by Neoshoco. It has been serialized in Shueisha's shōnen manga magazine Jump Square since August 2023. An anime television series adaptation produced by Toho Animation Studio is set to premiere in 2027.

== Plot ==
On the day of the entrance ceremony at Ryuoh High School in Kamakura City, Eugene Korekishi, an elite student of British descent who rejects the supernatural, meets Mogari Shishikuno, a trainee exorcist from a long line of spiritual mediums. Despite their opposing worldviews, Eugene is drawn to Mogari's reckless sincerity. He begins to believe in Mogari, even though he does not believe in spirits. Together, they recruit Kaoru Kanzaki, a boy haunted by his ability to see ghosts, and Kotaro Tamon, who can only communicate with the dead. They establish the Paranormal Research Club, also known as the Phantom Busters. The series follows the club's battles against evil spirits and the friendship of its four members.

== Characters ==
Mogari Shishikuno (宍喰野 虎落, Shishikuno Mogari)
Voiced by: Nobuhiko Okamoto
Eugene Korekishi (是岸 遊人, Korekishi Yūjin)
Voiced by: Natsuki Hanae
Kaoru Kanzaki (観崎 薫, Kanzaki Kaoru)
Voiced by: Koki Uchiyama
Kotaro Tamon (多聞 康太郎, Tamon Kōtarō)
Voiced by: Ryōta Suzuki

== Media ==
=== Manga ===
Written and illustrated by Neoshoco, Phantom Busters was first published as a one-shot in Shueisha's shōnen manga magazine Jump SQ.Rise on October 26, 2022. It started its serialization in Shueisha's Jump Square magazine on August 4, 2023. Shueisha has collected its chapters into individual tankōbon volumes, with the first one released on December 4, 2023. As of October 2, 2026, eight volumes have been released.

In North America, the manga has been licensed for English release by Viz Media, with the first volume released on October 14, 2025.

==== Volumes ====
No.	Original release date	Original ISBN	English release date	English ISBN
1	December 4, 2023	978-4-08-883724-6	October 14, 2025	978-1-9747-5783-1
2	April 4, 2024	978-4-08-883894-6	January 6, 2026	978-1-9747-6188-3
3	August 2, 2024	978-4-08-884141-0	April 7, 2026	978-1-9747-6246-0
4	December 4, 2024	978-4-08-884353-7	July 7, 2026	978-1-9747-6580-5
5	June 4, 2025	978-4-08-884464-0	October 6, 2026	978-1-9747-6581-2
6	October 3, 2025	978-4-08-884701-6	January 5, 2027	978-1-9747-6850-9
7	February 4, 2026	978-4-08-884846-4	—	—
8	October 2, 2026	978-4-08-885212-6	—	—

=== Anime ===
In September 2026, it was announced that the manga would receive an anime television series adaptation. It will be produced by Toho Animation Studio and directed by Chika Nagaoka, with character designs by Takahiro Kishida and Rina Iwamoto. The series is set to premiere in 2027.

== Reception ==
The manga was nominated for the tenth Next Manga Award in the print category in 2024 and was ranked nineteenth; it was nominated for the 2025 edition in the same category, and was ranked fourteenth. The series was ranked second in the Nationwide Bookstore Employees' Recommended Comics list of 2025. The manga was also ranked fourth in AnimeJapan's "Manga We Want to See Animated" poll in 2025.
