= Breach (Lewis Capaldi EP) =

EP by Lewis Capaldi
- Released: 8 November 2018
- Genre: Pop
- Length: 13:10
- Label: Virgin EMI Records
- Producer: Edd Holloway; Freeform Five; Jonathan Quarmby; Mike Stent; Nick Atkinson; TMS

Lewis Capaldi chronology
Bloom (2017)	Breach (2018)	Divinely Uninspired to a Hellish Extent (2019)

Singles from Breach
- 1. "Tough" Released: 8 June 2018; 2. "Grace" Released: 21 September 2018; 3. "Someone You Loved" Released: 8 November 2018

Breach is the second extended play by Scottish singer-songwriter Lewis Capaldi. It was released as a digital download on 8 November 2018. It includes the singles "Tough", "Grace" and "Someone You Loved", and a demo of "Something Borrowed". Zane Lowe premiered "Someone You Loved" on Apple's Beats 1 radio on the day of release.

== Critical reception ==
Capitol Records said, "With its emotionally resonant, beautifully observed songs about love and relationships, Breach is yet another showcase for Capaldi’s vocal and songwriting talent." Kathryn O'Leary of Ones to Watch said, "Breach is a testimony to broken hearts and emotionally incomplete people just trying to find their soulmate. The songs are beautifully constructed to convey every ounce of sincerity and integrity that exists in love as well as its pitfalls and pain."

== Track listing ==
No.	Title	Length
1.	"Tough"	3:48
2.	"Grace"	3:03
3.	"Someone You Loved"	3:02
4.	"Something Borrowed" (Demo)	3:15
Total length:		13:10

== Charts ==
=== Weekly charts ===
Chart (2019)	Peak position
Canadian Albums (Billboard)	95

=== Year-end charts ===
Chart (2019)	Position
Danish Albums (Hitlisten)	71

=== Certifications ===
Region	Certification	Certified units/sales
Denmark (IFPI Danmark)	Gold	10,000^{‡}
^{‡} Sales+streaming figures based on certification alone.
