= Fade (Lewis Capaldi song) =

Single by Lewis Capaldi

from the EP Bloom and the album Divinely Uninspired to a Hellish Extent
- Released: 9 October 2017
- Length: 4:20
- Label: Virgin
- Songwriters: Capaldi; James Ryan Ho
- Producer: Malay

Lewis Capaldi singles chronology
"Lost on You" (2017)	"Fade" (2017)	"Rush" (2018)

"Fade" is a song by Scottish singer-songwriter Lewis Capaldi. It was released as a digital download on 9 October 2017 via Virgin Records as the third single from his debut extended play Bloom and his debut studio album Divinely Uninspired to a Hellish Extent. The song peaked at number 33 on the Scottish Singles Chart.

== Charts ==
Chart performance for "Fade"
Chart (2017)	Peak position
Scotland Singles (OCC)	33

== Certifications ==
Certifications for "Fade"
Region	Certification	Certified units/sales
United Kingdom (BPI)	Gold	400,000^{‡}
^{‡} Sales+streaming figures based on certification alone.

== Release history ==
Release history and formats for "Fade"
Region	Date	Format	Label
United Kingdom	9 October 2017	Digital download	Virgin
