= Bruises (Lewis Capaldi song) =

Single by Lewis Capaldi

from the EP Bloom and the album Divinely Uninspired to a Hellish Extent
- Released: 31 March 2017
- Length: 3:38
- Label: Self-released; Virgin
- Songwriters: Capaldi; James Earp

Lewis Capaldi singles chronology
"Bruises" (2017)	"Lost on You" (2017)

Music video
- "Bruises" on YouTube

"Bruises" is the debut single by Scottish singer-songwriter Lewis Capaldi. It was initially self-released independently on 31 March 2017, later being re-released as a digital download on 16 May 2017, after Capaldi signed to Virgin Records, as the lead single from his debut extended play Bloom and his debut studio album Divinely Uninspired to a Hellish Extent. It was released once again on 7 January 2020 as Capaldi's third single.

== Background ==
It was the first song he had written with a piano. Originally, it was called "Something in the Water Pt. II".

== Track listing ==
Digital download
No.	Title	Length
1.	"Bruises"	3:38
2.	"Bruises" (Steve Void remix)	3:32

Remixes EP
No.	Title	Length
1.	"Bruises"	3:38
2.	"Bruises" (Live Orchestral version)	3:48
3.	"Bruises" (Guitar acoustic)	3:46
4.	"Bruises" (Steve Void remix)	3:32

== Charts ==
=== Weekly charts ===
Chart (2019–2020)	Peak position
Australia (ARIA)	46
Austria (Ö3 Austria Top 40)	60
Belgium (Ultratip Bubbling Under Flanders)	3
Canada Hot 100 (Billboard)	67
Germany (GfK)	84
Hungary (Single Top 40)	28
Ireland (IRMA)	8
Lithuania (AGATA)	59
Netherlands (Single Top 100)	98
New Zealand (Recorded Music NZ)	40
Norway (VG-lista)	15
Portugal (AFP)	139
Scotland Singles (OCC)	2
Slovakia Singles Digital (ČNS IFPI)	93
Sweden (Sverigetopplistan)	43
Switzerland (Schweizer Hitparade)	42
UK Singles (OCC)	6
US Bubbling Under Hot 100 (Billboard)	22
US Hot Rock & Alternative Songs (Billboard)	47

=== Year-end charts ===
Chart (2019)	Position
Ireland (IRMA)	19
UK Singles (OCC)	25
Chart (2020)	Position
Australia (ARIA)	79
Denmark (Tracklisten)	69
Ireland (IRMA)	27
New Zealand (Recorded Music NZ)	48
Sweden (Sverigetopplistan)	39
Switzerland (Schweizer Hitparade)	82
UK Singles (OCC)	24

== Certifications ==
Region	Certification	Certified units/sales
Australia (ARIA)	7× Platinum	490,000^{‡}
Austria (IFPI Austria)	3× Platinum	90,000^{‡}
Brazil (Pro-Música Brasil)	Platinum	60,000^{‡}
Canada (Music Canada)	3× Platinum	240,000^{‡}
Denmark (IFPI Danmark)	2× Platinum	180,000^{‡}
Germany (BVMI)	Platinum	400,000^{‡}
Italy (FIMI)	Platinum	70,000^{‡}
New Zealand (RMNZ)	7× Platinum	210,000^{‡}
Poland (ZPAV)	Platinum	50,000^{‡}
Portugal (AFP)	2× Platinum	20,000^{‡}
United Kingdom (BPI)	4× Platinum	2,400,000^{‡}
Streaming
Sweden (GLF)	Platinum	8,000,000^{†}
^{‡} Sales+streaming figures based on certification alone.^{†} Streaming-only figures based on certification alone.

== Release history ==
Region	Date	Format	Label
United Kingdom	16 May 2017	Digital download	Virgin
Various	27 September 2019	Remixes	Vertigo; Universal
Various	11 October 2019	CD single	Vertigo; Universal

== Usage in media ==
The song has been featured in the second season of Riverdale and the third season of Magnum P.I.
