= Leaving My Love Behind =

Song by Lewis Capaldi

from the album Divinely Uninspired to a Hellish Extent (Extended edition)
- Released: 22 November 2019
- Length: 3:31
- Label: Vertigo; Capitol
- Songwriters: Lewis Capaldi; Andrew Frampton; Max Farrar
- Producers: Andrew Frampton; Max Farrar

"Leaving My Love Behind" is a song by Scottish singer-songwriter Lewis Capaldi. It was released as a track on 22 November 2019 via Vertigo and Capitol from the extended edition of his debut studio album Divinely Uninspired to a Hellish Extent, which was released on that day. The song peaked at number 11 on the Scottish Singles Chart.

== Charts ==
Chart performance for "Leaving My Love Behind"
Chart (2019)	Peak position
Scotland Singles (OCC)	11

== Certifications ==
Certifications for "Leaving My Love Behind"
Region	Certification	Certified units/sales
United Kingdom (BPI)	Silver	200,000^{‡}
^{‡} Sales+streaming figures based on certification alone.
