= Grace (Lewis Capaldi song) =

Single by Lewis Capaldi

from the EP Breach and the album Divinely Uninspired to a Hellish Extent
- Released: 21 September 2018
- Length: 3:04
- Label: Virgin
- Songwriter(s): Lewis Capaldi; Nick Atkinson; Edd Holloway
- Producer(s): Nick Atkinson; Edd Holloway

Lewis Capaldi singles chronology
"Tough" (2018)	"Grace" (2018)	"Someone You Loved" (2018)

"Grace" is a song by Scottish singer-songwriter Lewis Capaldi. It was released as a digital download on 21 September 2018 via Virgin Records as the second single from his second extended play Breach and the fourth single from his debut studio album Divinely Uninspired to a Hellish Extent. The song peaked at number nine on the UK Singles Chart.

== Music video ==
A music video to accompany the release of "Grace" was first released onto YouTube on 21 September 2018 at a total length of three minutes and thirty-two seconds. The video shows Lewis filling in for a friend at a local Gentleman's Club. It took inspiration from the dance scenes in the film Napoleon Dynamite and the series I'm Alan Partridge.

Capaldi later recreated the choreography onstage with male dancers while performing the song at his show in London in November 2018.

== Track listing ==
Digital download
No.	Title	Length
1.	"Grace"	3:04

== Charts ==
=== Weekly charts ===
Chart (2018–19)	Peak position
Ireland (IRMA)	9
Scotland (OCC)	6
UK Singles (OCC)	9

=== Year-end charts ===
Chart (2019)	Position
Ireland (IRMA)	22
UK Singles (Official Charts Company)	27

== Certifications ==
Region	Certification	Certified units/sales
Australia (ARIA)	2× Platinum	140,000^{‡}
Brazil (Pro-Música Brasil)	Platinum	40,000^{‡}
Canada (Music Canada)	Gold	40,000^{‡}
Denmark (IFPI Danmark)	Gold	45,000^{‡}
New Zealand (RMNZ)	Platinum	30,000^{‡}
United Kingdom (BPI)	3× Platinum	1,800,000^{‡}
^{‡} Sales+streaming figures based on certification alone.

== Release history ==
Region	Date	Format	Label
United Kingdom	21 September 2018	Digital download	Virgin

== Usage in media ==
The song made an appearance in the 22nd episode of the medical drama series Grey's Anatomy's 15th season.
