= World of Dance season 2 =

World of Dance
- Season 2
- Hosted by: Jenna Dewan
- Judges: Ne-Yo; Jennifer Lopez; Derek Hough
- Winner: The Lab
- Runner-up: Michael Dameski (Upper)

Release
- Original network: NBC
- Original release: May 29 – September 12, 2018

Season chronology
- ← Previous; Season 1 Next → Season 3

The second season of American reality competition television series World of Dance premiered May 29, 2018, on NBC. Jennifer Lopez, Ne-Yo, and Derek Hough returned as the judges. Jenna Dewan also returned as the host for her second and final season.

== Production ==
Season 2 was taped between January and March 2018 at Universal Studios Hollywood; about two months before first airing.

=== Format changes ===
While the format for season 2 remained relatively unchanged, there were a few slight alterations. Season 2 received a 16-episode order., six more than the ten-episode first season. Additionally, this season, a fourth category, Junior Team, was added for acts under 18 with 5 or more members. The qualifier rounds are cut down from a two minutes to a one-minute routine. The Duels are cut down from two minutes to a ´75 seconds´-routine. The top three highest-scoring acts in The Cut from each division will move on to The Divisional Final, in last season it was just the top two. The Cut, Divisional and World Final rounds are cut down from a two minutes to a '90 seconds'-routine. In The Cut and Divisional Final guest celebrities are assigned as mentors to each division. On World Final there are intermezzo shows. This season by Les Twins, Keone & Mari (actually Mariel) Madrid, Kinjaz and Derek Hough.

=== Show concept ===
In preparation for season two, handpicked competitors, being talented in any styles of dancing, from qualifying events around the nation and thousands of online submissions, are divided into four divisions:

1. Junior (groups of 1–4, under 18),
2. Upper (groups of 1–4, 18 and older),
3. Junior Team (groups of 5+, under 18) and
4. Upper Team (groups of 5+, 18 and older).

In some cases dancers who didn't apply were directly contacted by the producers or their agents.

The elimination process of the contestants are in four rounds:

1. The Qualifiers - The contestants have to qualify with at least 80 points to make it to The Duels.
2. The Duels - The contestants choose their opponent starting with the highest scorer from the qualifiers. If the number of contestants in a division is uneven, the last duel will be competed by the three remaining opponents that were unpicked previously. The winner of the duel is the contestant/s with the highest score who then move on to The Cut.
3. The Cut - Mentors are assigned to each division to prepare the contestants for their performances. The top three scoring acts in each division move on to Divisional Final.
4. Divisional Final - The mentors still support the contestants from each division. A guest judge joins the panel, so there are four judges. The top scoring act in each division will become division champion and move on to the World Final.

In the World Final all four division champions will compete for the US$1,000,000 grand prize. The concept of last season is copied; every contestant will perform twice in two separate rounds. The average score of both rounds by each contestant will make their final score. The contestant(s) with the highest final score will be crowned World of Dance champion 2018 and will win the US$1,000,000 grand prize.

=== Scoring ===
The judges are scoring in 5 categories. Each category is worth 20 points, with a perfect score of 100:

- Performance (20 points):
  - Effort: How many different elements were put into the routine without overloading or rushing through it. What was the whole effort to dance the performance by the act.
  - Personality: How characters and personality put into the performance, in the sense of acting to stimulate emotions by the audience, telling a story or framing pictures.
- Technique (20 points):
  - Transitions: How smooth and elegant the transitions from move to move were without lacking a performance moment.
  - Cleanness: How synchronized, ordered by a pattern, precise and committed the movements were within the act.
  - Execution: How flawless the execution of the performance by the act was to the performance song.
- Choreography (20 points):
  - Difficulty: How difficult it was to perform the figures and movements by the act from judges point of view.
  - Musicality: How well pictures, figures and movements were choreographed to the sound and beat of the performance song.
  - Tricks: Are unexpected show elements included by properties, clothing or the bodies of the dancers and how well was it done.
- Creativity (20 points):
  - Originality: How unique, new, fresh and interesting was the performance.
  - Artistic Choices: What styles of dancing were shown and merged. How well was it done regarding basic dance styles and style culture, e.g. costumes, shoes. The performance song and the use of properties are artistic choices as well. How well did they fit to the performance.
  - Dynamics: How energizing and powerful the performance was and how much action was on stage.
- Presentation (20 points):
  - Crowd Appeal: How the crowd around the show stage reacted to the performance.
  - Impact: How memorable, influential and worth talking about it later the performance was.

== Judges, host and mentors ==
Season 2 host and judges

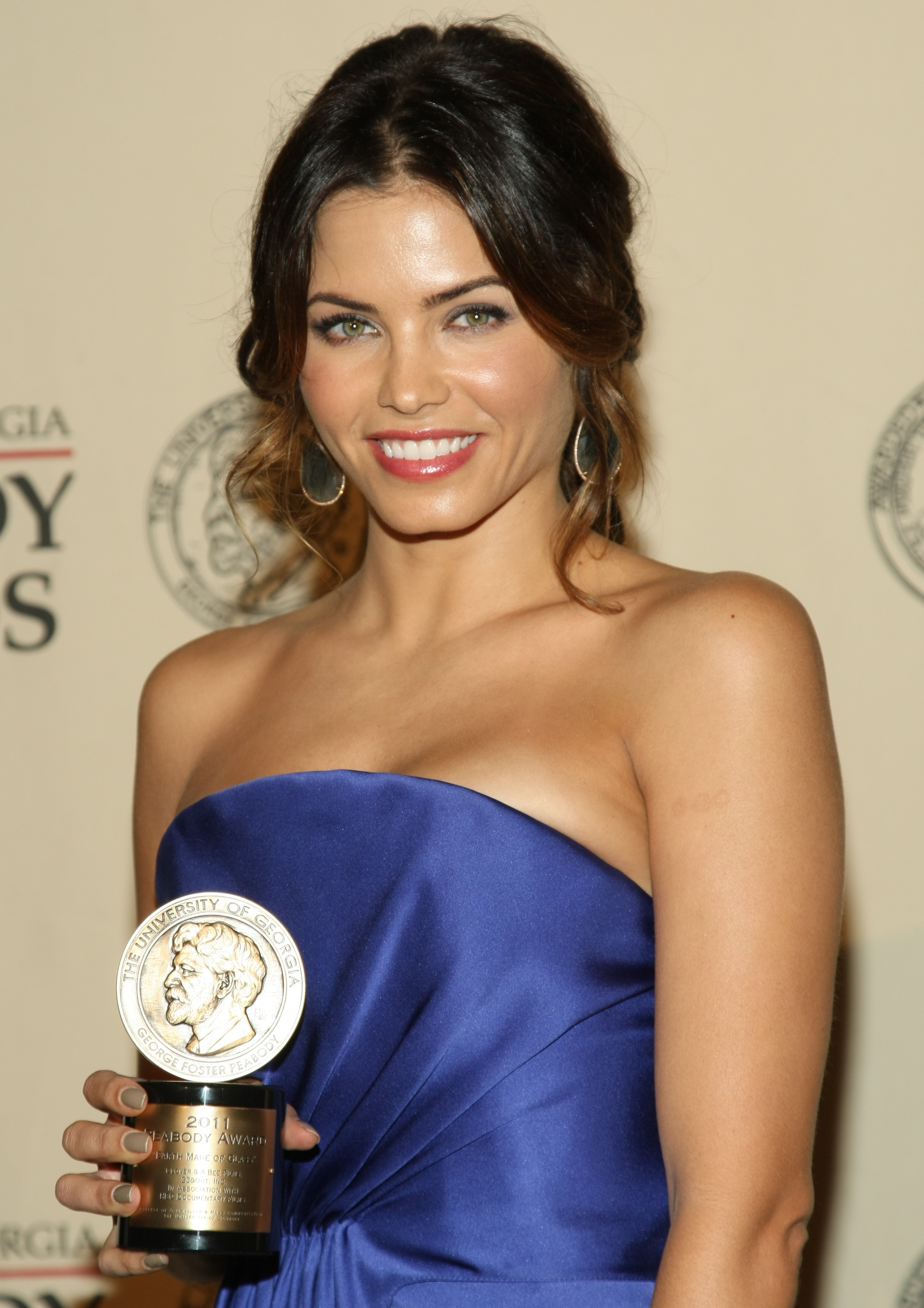
Jenna Dewan

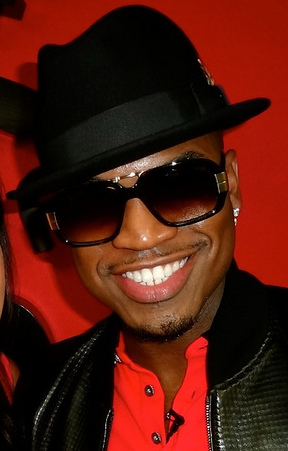
Ne-Yo

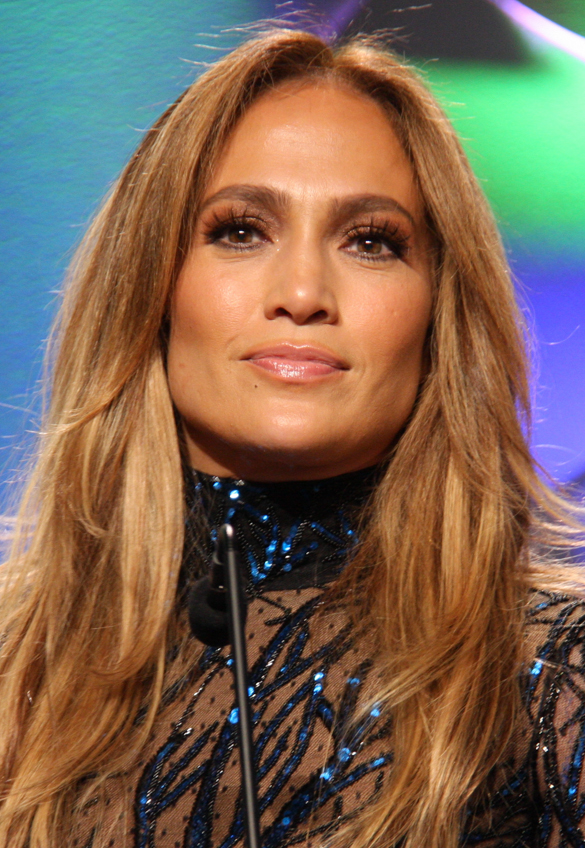
Jennifer Lopez

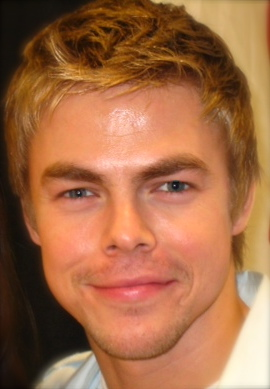
Derek Hough

Jennifer Lopez, Ne-Yo, and Derek Hough returned as the series judges, with Jenna Dewan returning as host. Misty Copeland, who guest judged in season 1, came back as guest judge for the Divisional Final, with Julianne Hough, Mel B, Savion Glover and Paula Abdul also joining as guest mentors for The Cut.

Tony Award winner Savion Glover, collaborated with judge Jennifer Lopez with the Junior Team division. Actress, dancer, singer and Emmy Award-winning choreographer Julianne Hough, worked with her brother, judge Derek Hough, in the Upper division. “America’s Got Talent” judge Mel B joined forces with judge Ne-Yo in mentoring the Junior division. World-renowned dancer/choreographer Paula Abdul teamed with host/mentor Jenna Dewan in the Upper Team division Grammy Award-winning and multi-platinum selling artist Ciara joined as guest mentor during the Divisional Final as well (airing Wednesday, Sept. 5 at 9 p.m. ET/PT).

Three weeks after the season finale host Jenna Dewan publicly announced that she would not return as host for season 3. “It has been an absolute thrill to be a part of this incredible, groundbreaking show from the very beginning. I am forever grateful of my NBC family. However I will not be returning to the show as host for season 3.” While she did not return for season 3 as a host, she confirmed she would be returning briefly as a mentor.

== Dancers ==
The acts competing in season 2 were released by People on May 1, 2018, and Bustle. The list of contestants who made it to The Duels is published by NewsWeek, except Elektro Elite and ThaMOST (s.below). The ages for each dance act were made available on the World of Dance website.

Table key
Key	Description
	Contestant(s) came in first in the World Final and won the competition
	Contestant(s) didn't win in the World Final
	Contestant(s) has/have qualified for the Divisional Final but didn't make it to The World Final
	Contestant(s) has/have qualified for The Cut but didn't make it to The Divisional Final
	Contestant(s) has/have qualified for The Duels but didn't make it to The Cut
	Contestant(s) did not advance in The Qualifiers

=== Junior (under 18, up to 4 members) ===
Dance act	Age(s)	Hometown	Dance style	Elimination date	Placement	Average Score
Charity & Andres	17	Springville, Utah	Contemporary	-	World Final (3rd Place)	94.9
Sean & Kaycee	16/15	Los Angeles, California	Hip Hop Fusion	September 5, 2018	Divisional Final	93.4
Jaxon Willard	16	American Fork, Utah	Contemporary	September 5, 2018	Divisional Final	92.1
Josh & Taylor	18/15	Edmonton, Canada	Hip Hop	August 29, 2018	Cut	90.3
Avery & Marcus	13/17	San Clemente, California / Scottsdale, Arizona	Contemporary Ballet	August 29, 2018	Cut	87.5
Jonas & Ruby	14/15	Miami, Florida	Ballroom	August 29, 2018	Cut	88.1
Madison Brown	12	Wellington, Florida	Contemporary	August 29, 2018	Cut	86.3
Victoria Caban	14	Jersey City, New Jersey	Flamenco	August 29, 2018	Cut	90.0
3 Xtreme	13-15	Bergen County, New Jersey	Hip Hop	August 1, 2018	Duels	85.2
Daniel & Mishella	10	Los Angeles, California	Ballroom	August 15, 2018	Duels	84.9
Elektro Elite	14-16*	Gilbert, Arizona	Hip Hop	August 15, 2018	Duels	81.7
Eva Igo^{1}	15	Inver Grove Heights, Minnesota	Contemporary	July 25, 2018	Duels	93.5
FRESHH	14-16	Vancouver, Canada	Hip Hop	August 8, 2018	Duels	86.0
Lucas Marinetto	14	Leesburg, Virginia	Tap	August 8, 2018	Duels	85.4
Second to None	13-15	San Diego, California	Tap	August 15, 2018	Duels	84.5
Vivian Ruiz	16	Miami, Florida	Contemporary	August 1, 2018	Duels	89.4
The Gentlemen	-	Fairfield, California	Hip Hop	July 17, 2018	Qualifiers	79.7

- Ages of Elektro Elite are taken from a personal Q&A video.

=== Junior Team (under 18, 5-15 members) ===
Dance act	Age(s)	Hometown	Dance style	Elimination date	Placement	Average Score
The Lab^{1}	8-16	West Covina, California	Hip Hop	-	Winners	97.0
Fabulous Sisters	11-17	Fukushima, Japan	Urban Dance	September 5, 2018	Divisional Final	94.7
The Rock Company	10-16	Las Vegas, Nevada	Contemporary	September 5, 2018	Divisional Final	91.9
Expressenz	14-17	Indianapolis, Indiana	Contemporary	August 22, 2018	Cut	89.3
FLIP	15-17	Quebec, Canada	Whacking	August 22, 2018	Cut	87.1
The Pulse	15-17	Orem, Utah	Ballroom	August 22, 2018	Cut	84.2
Quad Squad	11-17	Anaheim Hills, California	Contemporary	August 22, 2018	Cut	89.3
Cubcakes Dance Crew	9-12	Orange County, California	Hip Hop	August 8, 2018	Duels	85.5
Dem Raider Boyz	15-17	Greenbelt, Maryland	Stepping	August 8, 2018	Duels	84.7
Girl Cool	11-17	Los Angeles, California	Jazz/Fusion	August 15, 2018	Duels	82.9
Iowa Girlz	12-16	Pleasant Hill, Iowa	Contemporary	August 15, 2018	Duels	85.7
Lil Killaz Crew	11-17	Minsk, Belarus	B-Boying	August 1, 2018	Duels	84.4
RASCALS	9-17	Waipahu, Hawaii	Hip Hop	July 25, 2018	Duels	89.5
Tribe Unleashed	11-17	Pittsburgh, Pennsylvania	Hip Hop	August 15, 2018	Duels	82.9
The Untouchables	10-17	Miami, Florida	Ballroom	July 25, 2018	Duels	89.0

=== Upper (18 and over, up to 4 members) ===
Dance act	Age(s)	Hometown	Dance style	Elimination date	Placement	Average Score
Michael Dameski	22	Sydney, Australia	Contemporary	-	World Final (Runner-up)	95.0
Karen y Ricardo	23/24	Santiago, Chile	Latin Cabaret	September 5, 2018	Divisional Final	98.1
Ashley & Zack	24/26	Los Angeles, California	Contemporary	September 5, 2018	Divisional Final	88.8
Alisa & Joseph	23/30	Estonia & Greece	Urban Dance	August 22, 2018	Cut	88.2
BDash & Konkrete	27/29	Los Angeles, California	Krumping	August 22, 2018	Cut	93.2
DNA^{1}	28/32	New York City, New York	Ballroom	August 22, 2018	Cut	88.6
MarInspired	23/27	Los Angeles, California	Contemporary	August 22, 2018	Cut	88.6
Angyil	25	Kansas, Missouri	Popping	July 25, 2018	Duels	86.8
Dragon House	24-27	Atlanta, Georgia	Animation	August 1, 2018	Duels	83.2
Elektro Botz	19-21	Tempe, Arizona	Popping	August 1, 2018	Duels	88.0
L & J	24 & 30	Calgary, Canada & Paris, France	Contemporary	August 15, 2018	Duels	88.2
Luka & Jenalyn^{1}	17/20	Toronto, Canada	Cabaret Ballroom	July 25, 2018	Duels	89.7
Morning Of Owl	-	Suwon, South Korea	Street Fusion	August 15, 2018	Duels	87.9
Pasha & Daniella	24/31	New York City, New York	Ballroom	July 25, 2018	Duels	87.3
Hilty & Bosch	35/36	Osaka, Japan	Locking	May 29, 2018	Qualifiers	78.3
St Kingz	31-33	Tokyo, Japan	Hip Hop/Comedy	July 10, 2018	Qualifiers	79.0

=== Upper Team (18 and over, 5-15 members) ===
Dance act	Age(s)	Hometown	Dance style	Elimination date	Placement	Average Score
S-Rank	13-27	Los Angeles, California	Hip Hop	-	World Final (4th Place)	93.1
The Ruggeds	21-30	Eindhoven, Netherlands	B-Boying	September 5, 2018	Divisional Final	88.1
Poreotics	20-29	Los Angeles, California	Hip Hop	September 5, 2018	Divisional Final	88.6
The Bradas	19-23	Auckland, New Zealand	Hip Hop	August 29, 2018	Cut	88.8
Connection	14-24	Chihuahua, Mexico	Hip Hop	August 29, 2018	Cut	89.1
Desi Hoppers	20-28	Mumbai, India	Hip Hop	August 29, 2018	Cut	92.3
Embodiment	15-28	Los Angeles, California	Contemporary	August 29, 2018	Cut	89.6
Lock 'N lol Crew	20-31	Seoul, South Korea	Hip Hop/Lockin'	August 29, 2018	Cut	85.7
Brotherhood	20-28	Vancouver, Canada	Hip Hop	August 15, 2018	Duels	86.5
Funkywunks	17-28	Orlando, Florida	Hip Hop	August 8, 2018	Duels	86.0
The Jam Project	20-32	Washington D.C.	Tap	July 25, 2018	Duels	85.7
Marissa & The Heartbreakers	20-29	Los Angeles, California	Heels	August 8, 2018	Duels	83.7
Opus Dance Collective	16-24	Toronto, Ontario	Contemporary	August 1, 2018	Duels	82.0
Pursuit	19-22	Los Angeles, California	Contemporary	August 8, 2018	Duels	84.7
Royal Flux^{1}	20-28	Los Angeles, California	Contemporary	August 1, 2018	Duels	87.7
ThaMOST	-	San Diego, California	Hip Hop	August 15, 2018	Duels	84.5
LD Dance Company	-	Houston, Texas	Samba	June 12, 2018	Qualifiers	74.3
Silver Beat	-	Rwanda / London, United Kingdom	Afrodance	June 26, 2018	Qualifiers	78.7

^1 This dance act competed on Season 1 of World of Dance

== The Qualifiers ==
The qualifier round took place between May 29, 2018, and July 24. In each round of the Qualifiers, the dance acts performed a 1-minute routine in front of the judges and a live studio audience. For a dance act to move to the next round, they had to receive an average score of 80 or higher. Karen y Ricardo was the first dance act of the season (and the second in the show's history) to receive a score of 100 from one or more of the judges, setting up an all-time show high score of 99.7 points, until Charity & Andres became the first act in the show's history to receive a perfect score of 100, earning it during The Duels round.

Table key
Key	Description
	Contestant(s) did not qualify

Contestant performances and Judges' score
Date	Name	Division	Performance song	Judges' score			
Date	Name	Division	Performance song	Ne-Yo	Jennifer	Derek	Average
May 29	Desi Hoppers	Upper Team	"Shape of You" - Ed Sheeran (Note: Desi Hoppers used a remix of "Shape of You" that incorporated Indian drums.)	98	94	96	96.0
May 29	Sean & Kaycee	Junior	"Silence" - Marshmello (ft. Khalid)	97	96	95	96.0
May 29	S-Rank	Upper Team	"One Time Comin" - YG	92	91	90	91.0
May 29	Jaxon Willard	Junior	"Fragile" - Kygo & Labrinth	95	96	91	94.0
May 29	FLIP	Junior Team	"Feeling Good" - Avicii	81	83	84	82.7
May 29	Hilty & Bosch	Upper	"Bad Man" - Pitbull	79	78	78	78.3
May 29	Karen y Ricardo	Upper	"Pégate" - Ricky Martin	100	100	99	99.7
June 5	The Lab	Junior Team	"Take It to da House" - Trick Daddy	95	92	95	94.0
June 5	Pasha & Daniella	Upper	"Limit to Your Love" - James Blake	79	93	87	86.3
June 5	Connection	Upper Team	"Mi Gente" - J Balvin ft. Willy William	90	92	90	90.7
June 5	Charity & Andres	Junior	"Say You Won't Let Go" - James Arthur	97	96	93	95.3
June 5	BDash & Konkrete	Upper	"Moves" - Big Sean	96	93	94	94.3
June 5	Fabulous Sisters	Junior Team	"Beethoven Scherzo" - David Garrett	94	93	97	94.7
June 12	The Ruggeds	Upper Team	"Right Here, Right Now" - Fatboy Slim	82	83	85	83.3
June 12	Josh & Taylor	Junior	"Bellyache" - Billie Eilish (Marian Hill Remix)	94	94	92	93.3
June 12	Lock 'N lol Crew	Upper Team		80	79	84	81.0
June 12	Michael Dameski	Upper	"Mercy" - Shawn Mendes	90	95	93	92.7
June 12	LD Dance Company	Upper Team	"Danza Kuduro" - Don Omar	79	73	71	74.3
June 12	Rascals	Junior Team	"Let's Go" - Travis Barker	83	83	88	84.7
June 12	Elektro Botz	Upper	"Fireflies" - Owl City	93	88	86	89.0
June 19	Jonas & Ruby	Junior	"Legend" - The Score	85	87	82	84.7
June 19	The Bradas	Upper Team	"I Mean It" - G-Eazy	86	92	85	87.7
June 19	Lucas Marinetto	Junior	"Levels" - Nick Jonas	82	84	82	82.7
June 19	Expressenz	Junior Team	"Something in the Water" - Carrie Underwood	84	90	87	87.0
June 19	Poreotics	Upper Team	"TRNDSTTR" - Black Coast ft. M. Maggie (Lucian Remix)	87	90	87	88.0
June 19	Eva Igo	Junior	"I Ran(So Far Away)" - Hidden Citizens	96	95	94	95.0
June 26	Embodiment	Upper Team	“Believer” - Imagine Dragons	80	88	86	84.7
June 26	Daniel & Mishella	Junior	Runaway Baby” - Bruno Mars	80	87	81	82.7
June 26	Marissa & The Heartbreakers	Upper Team	“Love So Soft” - Kelly Clarkson (Cash Cash Remix)	83	86	82	83.7
June 26	Madison Brown	Junior	“The Fire” - Bishop Briggs	84	88	89	87.0
June 26	Freshh	Junior	“Like That” - Memphis Bleek	83	84	85	84.0
June 26	Silver Beat	Upper Team	“Recebe” - Black House	80	77	79	78.7
June 26	Royal Flux	Upper Team	”Don’t You Cry for Me” - Cobi	82	91	88	87.0
July 10	DNA	Upper	"O Fortuna" - Carmina Burana - Carl Orff	85	89	89	87.7
July 10	Brotherhood	Upper Team	“Run It” - Chris Brown	81	75	85	80.3
July 10	Vivian Ruiz	Junior	“You Don’t Do It for Me Anymore” - Demi Lovato	83	84	82	83.0
July 10	The Untouchables	Junior Team	"Instruction" - Jax Jones and Demi Lovato	87	89	90	88.7
July 10	St Kingz	Upper	"Bang Bang" - will.i.am	79	78	80	79.0
July 10	Ashley & Zack	Upper	"Versace on the Floor" - Bruno Mars	84	84	87	85.0
July 10	The Rock Company	Junior Team	"Imagine" - Emeli Sandé	97	97	96	96.7
July 17	Cubcakes Dance Crew	Junior Team	Swalla" - Jason Derulo	84	85	80	83.0
July 17	Luka & Jenalyn	Upper	"Down" - Marian Hill	88	86	87	87.0
July 17	The Jam Project	Upper Team	"25 or 6 to 4" - Chicago	82	83	84	83.0
July 17	Marinspired	Upper	"Issues" - Julia Michaels	88	96	90	91.3
July 17	Alisa & Joseph	Upper	"Stand by Me" - Ben E. King	92	94	86	90.7
July 17	The Gentlemen	Junior	"Another Love Song" - Ne-Yo	81	79	79	79.7
July 17	Dragon House	Upper	"Unforgettable" - French Montana	81	80	79	80.0
July 17	Quad Squad	Junior Team	"Sorry Not Sorry" - Demi Lovato	91	86	90	89.0
July 24	Victoria Caban	Junior	“Te Amo” - Rihanna	89	93	90	90.7
July 24	Pursuit	Upper Team	"All Time Low" - Jon Bellion	86	89	86	87.0
July 24	L & J	Upper	"What About Us" - Pink	94	89	88	90.3
July 24	The Pulse	Junior Team	"Bailar" - Deorro	78	84	79	80.3
July 24	Avery & Marcus	Junior	"Jungle" - Jamie N Common & X Ambassadors	85	83	84	84.0
July 24	FunkyWunks	Upper Team	"Sexy and I Know It" - LMFAO	89	87	85	87.0
July 24	Morning of Owl	Upper	"Go" - The Chemical Brothers.	82	86	84	84.0
July 24	Iowa Girlz	Junior Team	Everybody Wants to Rule the World - Lorde	-	-	-	87.3
July 24	Dem Raider Boys	Junior Team	G.D.F.R. - Flo Rida	-	-	-	84.0
July 24	Girl Cool	Junior Team	Feel It Still - Portugal. The Man	-	-	-	81.7
July 24	Second To None	Junior	Glorious - Macklemore	-	-	-	82.7
July 24	Lil Killaz Crew	Junior Team	"It's Just Begun" - The Jimmy Castor Bunch	-	-	-	83.0
July 24	Opus Dance Collective	Upper Team	Green Light - Lorde	-	-	-	80.7
July 24	3 Xtreme	Junior	Mic Drop - BTS	-	-	-	83.3
July 24	Tribe Unleashed	Junior Team	Hollaback Girl - Gwen Stefani	-	-	-	83.0
July 24	Angyil	Upper	Confessions Part II - Usher	-	-	-	85.3

Some average scores are taken from a summary clip from the TV broadcast of part 8. Elektro Elite has qualified with 80 points and ThaMOST with 84 points, but neither performance was posted as a Digital Exclusive, nor are the acts listed on NBC World of Dance website.

== The Duels ==
In each round of The Duels, two acts in the same division compete for a spot in the next round. In each division, the acts with the top qualifying scores choose their opponents, then both acts perform back-to-back, receiving feedback from the judges. The act with the highest average at the end of the duel moves on to the next round; the other faces immediate elimination. Charity & Andres earned the first perfect score in the show's run during The Duels.

Table key
Key	Description
	Contestant(s) was/were eliminated by a duel

The Qualifiers scores
Rank	Upper		Upper Team		Junior		Junior Team	
Rank	Name	Score	Name	Score	Name	Score	Name	Score
1st	Karen y Ricardo	99.7	Desi Hoppers	96.0	Sean & Kaycee	96.0	The Rock Company	96.7
2nd	BDash & Konkrete	94.3	S-Rank	91.0	Charity & Andres	95.3	Fabulous Sisters	94.7
3rd	Michael Dameski	92.7	Connection	90.7	Eva Igo	95.0	The Lab	94.0
4th	MarInspired	91.3	Poreotics	88.0	Jaxon Willard	94.0	Quad Squad	89.0
5th	Alisa & Joseph	90.7	The Bradas	87.7	Josh & Taylor	93.3	The Untouchables	88.7
6th	L & J	90.3	Funkywunks	87.0	Victoria Caban	90.7	Iowa Girlz	87.3
7th	Elektro Botz	89.0	Pursuit	87.0	Madison Brown	87.0	Expressenz	87.0
8th	DNA	87.7	Royal Flux	87.0	Jonas & Ruby	84.7	Rascals	84.7
9th	Luka & Jenalyn	87.0	Embodiment	84.7	Avery & Marcus	84.0	Dem Raider Boyz	84.0
10th	Pasha & Daniella	86.3	ThaMOST	84.0	FRESHH	84.0	Tribe Unleashed	83.0
11th	Angyil	85.3	Marissa & The Heartbreakers	83.7	3 Xtreme	83.3	Lil Killaz Crew	83.0
12th	Ashley & Zack	85.0	The Ruggeds	83.3	Vivian Ruiz	83.0	Cubcakes Dance Crew	83.0
13th	Morning Of Owl	84.0	The Jam Project	83.0	Daniel & Mishella	82.7	FLIP	82.7
14th	Dragon House	80.0	Lock 'N lol Crew	81.0	Lucas Marinetto	82.7	Girl Cool	81.7
15th			Opus Dance Collective	80.7	Second to None	82.7	The Pulse	80.3
16th			Brotherhood	80.3	Elektro Elite	80.0		

=== The Duel Picks ===
Opponent selection proceeded according to rank within each division, but performances have been arranged to spread the favorites among the episodes, in an effort to keep ratings up across all episodes.

Contestant performances and Judges' scores
Date	Division	Name	Performance song	Judges' score			
Date	Division	Name	Performance song	Ne-Yo	Jennifer	Derek	Average
July 25	Upper	Karen y Ricardo	"La Malanga" - Mercado Negro	97	99	99	98.3
July 25	Upper	Luka & Jenalyn	"Seven Nation Army" - The White Stripes	90	92	95	92.3
July 25	Junior Team	The Untouchables	"Warriors" - Imagine Dragons	89	89	90	89.3
July 25	Junior Team	Expressenz	"Say Something" - A Great Big World	93	95	94	94.0
July 25	Upper	Pasha & Daniella	"Faded" - ZHU	85	89	91	88.3
July 25	Upper	BDash & Konkrete	"Moonlight Sonata" - Covered Record	95	94	94	94.3
July 25	Junior Team	Rascals	"Snap Yo Fingers" - Lil Jon and E-40	97	94	92	94.3
July 25	Junior Team	Fabulous Sisters	"Shatter Me" - Lindsey Stirling	95	96	96	95.7
July 25	Upper	Michael Dameski	"Hanging On" - Ellie Goulding	95	94	95	94.7
July 25	Upper	Angyil	"Down the Road" - C2C.	90	87	88	88.3
July 25	Upper Team	The Bradas	"Caught Up" - Usher	90	90	89	89.7
July 25	Upper Team	The Jam Project	"I Feel Good" - James Brown	86	88	91	88.3
July 25	Junior	Eva Igo	Praying - Kesha	94	91	91	92
July 25	Junior	Avery & Marcus	Now or Never - Halsey	95	93	92	93.3
August 1	Junior Team	The Lab	"Lean Back" - Terror Squad	95	95	95	95.0
August 1	Junior Team	Lil Killaz Crew	"Pump It" - The Black Eyed Peas	84	87	86	85.7
August 1	Upper	Alisa & Joseph	"One in a Million" - Ne-Yo	88	87	88	87.7
August 1	Upper	Elektro Botz	"XO Tour Llif3" - Lil Uzi Vert	85	85	91	87.0
August 1	Upper Team	Opus Dance Collective	"Stone Cold" - Demi Lovato	80	85	85	83.3
August 1	Upper Team	Desi Hoppers	"Talk Dirty" - Jason Derulo (Note: Desi Hoppers used a remix of "Talk Dirty" that incorporated Indian drums.)	90	90	91	90.3
August 1	Junior	3 Xtreme	"Burn Up the Dance" - Dillon Francis	86	87	88	87
August 1	Junior	Sean & Kaycee	"Grimey" - TroyBoi	95	93	92	93.3
August 1	Upper Team	Royal Flux	"I Am Here" - Pink	86	89	90	88.3
August 1	Upper Team	Lock and LoL Crew	"Run Boy Run" - Woodkid	89	89	90	89.3
August 1	Upper	MarInspired	"Sign of the Times" - Harry Styles	85	87	88	86.7
August 1	Upper	Dragon House	"Break Ya Neck" - Busta Rhymes	85	84	90	86.3
August 1	Junior	Vivian Ruiz	"Came Here for Love" - Sigala	95	96	96	95.7
August 1	Junior	Charity & Andres	"Way Down We Go" - Kaleo	100	100	100	100.0
August 8	Junior	Lucas Marinetto	"Green Light" - John Legend	86	89	89	88
August 8	Junior	Jaxon Willard	"Surprise Yourself" - Jack Garratt	97	98	93	96.0
August 8	Upper Team	Marissa & The Heartbreakers	"Do It Like a Dude" - Jessie J	81	85	85	83.7
August 8	Upper Team	Poreotics	"Need You" - Dillon Francis	86	89	88	87.7
August 8	Junior	Jonas & Ruby	"Santa Maria" - The Gotan Project	90	90	94	91.3
August 8	Junior	Freshh	"It Takes Two" - Rob Base and DJ EZ Rock	90	88	86	88.0
August 8	Upper Team	Pursuit	"Go Off" - M.I.A.	80	84	83	82.3
August 8	Upper Team	The Ruggeds	"Come Down." - Anderson Paak	85	84	85	84.7
August 8	Junior Team	Flip	"Galvanize" - Beethoven/The Chemical Brother	90	88	93	90.3
August 8	Junior Team	Dem Raider Boyz	"Pump It Up" - Joe Budden	86	84	86	85.3
August 8	Junior Team	Cubcakes Dance Crew	"That's Not My Name" - The Ting Tings	88	88	88	88.0
August 8	Upper Team	Connection	"My Humps" - Black Eyed Peas.	85	86	85	85.3
August 8	Upper Team	FunkyWunks	"U Can't Touch This" - MC Hammer	84	85	86	85.0
August 15	Junior	Victoria Caban	"Havana" - Camila Cabello	94	96	92	94.0
August 15	Junior	Daniel & Mishella	"Sax" - Fleur East	86	87	88	87.0
August 15	Upper Team	S-Rank	"Drop It Like It's Hot" - Snoop Dogg Feat. Pharrell Williams	97	92	94	94.3
August 15	Upper Team	ThaMOST	"Temperature" - Sean Paul	85	85	85	85.0
August 15	Junior	Second To None	"Classic" - MKTO	88	83	88	86.3
August 15	Junior	Josh & Taylor	"Fallin'" - Alicia Keys	90	95	92	92.3
August 15	Upper	L&J	"I Like The Way" - Bodyrockers	84	87	87	86
August 15	Upper	DNA	"Proud Mary" - Tina Turner	88	89	88	88.3
August 15	Junior Team	Girl Cool	"These Boots Are Made for Walkin'" - Nancy Sinatra				84
August 15	Junior Team	Quad Squad	"Shout" - The Isley Brothers				93.0
August 15	Junior	Madison Brown	"Game of Survival" - Ruelle				86.3
August 15	Junior	Elektro Elite	"D.A.N.C.E." - Justice				83.3
August 15	Junior Team	Tribe Unleashed	"It's Tricky" - Run-D.M.C.				82.7
August 15	Junior Team	The Rock Company	"Love, Reign O'er Me" - Lovelife's remix of The Who				85.7
August 15	Junior Team	Iowa Girlz	"Never Forget You" - Zara Larsson				84
August 15	Junior Team	The Pulse	"Amor, Amor, Amor" - Jennifer Lopez				84.3
August 15	Upper	Ashley & Zack	"Don't Wanna Think" - Julia Michaels	91	92	93	92.0
August 15	Upper	Morning Of Owl	"The Rockafeller Skank" - Fatboy Slim	94	90	91	91.7
August 15	Upper Team	Embodiment	"Pray" - Sam Smith	94	93	93	93.3
August 15	Upper Team	Brotherhood	"HUMBLE" - Kendrick Lamar	94	91	93	92.7

Some average scores are taken from a summary clip from the TV broadcast of part 4.

== The Cut ==
In The Cut, the 30 remaining acts compete for three spots in each of their divisions. As each dance act competes, their final score is displayed on a leaderboard for their division. Once a dance act's score falls out of the top 3, they face immediate elimination. For this round, each of the judges and the host, Jenna Dewan, became mentors for one of the four divisions; They were also joined by four guest mentors: Savion Glover, Julianne Hough, Paula Abdul, and Mel B. Jennifer & Savion worked with the Junior Teams, Derek & Julianne worked with the Upper acts, Jenna & Paula worked with the Upper Teams, and Ne-Yo & Mel B worked with the Junior acts.

Table key
Key	Description
	Contestant(s) was/were eliminated

The Duels scores
Rank	Upper			Upper Team			Junior			Junior Team		
Rank	Name	Score	Cut Rank	Name	Score	Cut Rank	Name	Score	Cut Rank	Name	Score	Cut Rank
1st	Karen y Ricardo	98.3	1	S-Rank	94.3	2	Charity & Andres	100.0	1	Fabulous Sisters	95.7	2
2nd	Michael Dameski	94.7	2	Embodiment	93.3	5	Jaxon Willard	96.0	3	The Lab	95.0	1
3rd	BDash & Konkrete	94.3	4	Desi Hoppers	90.3	6	Victoria Caban	94.0	6	Expressenz	94.0	6
4th	Ashley & Zack	92.0	3	The Bradas	89.7	7	Avery & Marcus	93.3	6	Quad Squad	93.0	7
5th	DNA	88.7	5	Lock and LoL Crew	89.3	8	Sean & Kaycee	93.3	2	Flip	90.3	4
6th	Alisa & Joseph	87.7	7	Poreotics	87.7	3	Josh & Taylor	92.3	6	The Rock Company	85.7	3
7th	MarInspired	86.7	6	Connection	85.3	4	Jonas & Ruby	91.3	4	The Pulse	84.3	5
8th	-	-	-	The Ruggeds	84.7	1	Madison Brown	86.3	5	-	-	-

Contestant performances and Judges' scores
Date	Division	Name	Performance song	Judges' score			
Date	Division	Name	Performance song	Ne-Yo	Jennifer	Derek	Average
August 22	Junior Team	Flip	"Big Breakdown" - Hans Dulfer & Candy Dulfer / "Perm" - Bruno Mars	87	88	90	88.3
August 22	Junior Team	Expressenz	"California Dreamin'" - Sia	86	87	88	87.0
August 22	Junior Team	The Pulse	"Another One Bites the Dust" - Hidden Citizens				88.0
August 22	Junior Team	The Lab	"Cold Water" - Major Lazer ft. Justin Bieber & MØ	100	97	98	98.3
August 22	Junior Team	Quad Squad	"Blame" - Calvin Harris				86.0
August 22	Junior Team	The Rock Company	"Hallelujah" - Jeff Buckley	93	93	95	93.7
August 22	Junior Team	Fabulous Sisters	"Black and Gold" - Sam Sparro	94	97	98	96.3
August 22	Upper	Michael Dameski	"Lay Me Down" - Sam Smith	91	95	93	93.0
August 22	Upper	DNA	"I Could Fall in Love" - Selena	90	89	89	89.3
August 22	Upper	Alisa & Joseph	"Rather Be" - Clean Bandit				86.3
August 22	Upper	BDash & Konkrete	"Something Just Like This" - The Chainsmokers & Coldplay	92	91	90	91.0
August 22	Upper	MarInspired	"Make Me (Cry)" - Noah Cyrus	88	87	88	87.7
August 22	Upper	Ashley & Zack	"Fix You" - Coldplay	90	91	93	91.3
August 22	Upper	Karen y Ricardo	"Caminare" - Marc Anthony	100	99	98	99.0
August 29	Upper Team	Desi Hoppers	"Like A G6" - Far East Movement ft. The Cataracs & Dev (Note: Desi Hoppers used a remix of "Like A G6" that incorporated Indian drums.)	92	90	90	90.7
August 29	Upper Team	Embodiment	"Gravity" - John Mayer	89	91	93	91.0
August 29	Upper Team	Lock and LoL Crew	"Get Up Offa That Thing" - James Brown				86.7
August 29	Upper Team	The Bradas	"I'll Show You" - Justin Bieber	90	88	89	89.0
August 29	Upper Team	Connection	"Scream" - Usher	94	91	89	91.3
August 29	Upper Team	Poreotics	"A Thousand Miles" - Vanessa Carlton (Note: Poreotics used a remix of "A Thousand Miles" that incorporated a jelly donut edm soundtrack, from the comment Derek Hough made about them in The Duels.)	93	91	91	91.7
August 29	Upper Team	The Ruggeds	"Not Giving In" - Rudimental ft. John Newman & Alex Clare	92	92	94	92.7
August 29	Upper Team	S-Rank	"DNA" - Kendrick Lamar	91	93	93	92.3
August 29	Junior	Josh & Taylor	"Latch" - Disclosure ft. Sam Smith	86	83	87	85.3
August 29	Junior	Victoria Caban	"Titanium" - David Guetta ft. Sia				85.3
August 29	Junior	Jonas & Ruby	"Animals" - Martin Garrix	85	89	91	88.3
August 29	Junior	Madison Brown	"American Funeral" - Alex da Kid ft. Joseph Angel				85.7
August 29	Junior	Sean & Kaycee	"Can I Be Him" - James Arthur	88	94	94	92.0
August 29	Junior	Avery & Marcus	"Thunder" - Imagine Dragons	85	86	85	85.3
August 29	Junior	Charity & Andres	"Waves" - Dean Lewis	89	93	96	92.7
August 29	Junior	Jaxon Willard	"Higher" - The Score	90	90	92	90.7

== Divisional Final ==
In the Divisional Final, the 3 remaining acts in each division square off, with only one act going to the World Final to represent their division. Same as The Cut, each of the judges and the host, Jenna Dewan, became mentors for one of the four divisions. Jennifer mentored the Upper acts, Derek worked with the Junior Teams, Ne-Yo worked with the Upper Teams, and Jenna worked with the Junior acts. Guest mentor Ciara helped each division in their practice as well. Guest judge Misty Copeland joined the panel for this segment.

Table key
Key	Description
	Contestant(s) won their division, advancing them to the World Final
	Contestant(s) placed second in their division
	Contestant(s) placed third in their division

The Cut scores
Rank	Upper		Upper Team		Junior		Junior Team	
Rank	Name	Score	Name	Score	Name	Score	Name	Score
1st	Karen y Ricardo	99.0	The Ruggeds	92.7	Charity & Andres	92.7	The Lab	98.3
2nd	Michael Dameski	93.0	S-Rank	92.3	Sean & Kaycee	92.0	Fabulous Sisters	96.3
3rd	Ashley & Zack	91.3	Poreotics	91.7	Jaxon Willard	90.7	The Rock Company	93.7

Contestant performances and Judges' scores
Date	Division	Name	Performance song	Judges' score				
Date	Division	Name	Performance song	Ne-Yo	Misty	Jennifer	Derek	Average
September 5	Upper							
September 5	Upper	Karen y Ricardo	"Bemba Colora" - Celia Cruz	95	94	96	96	95.3
September 5	Upper	Ashley & Zack	"Gravity" - Alex & Sierra	84	86	87	90	86.8
September 5	Upper	Michael Dameski	"Madness" - Ruelle	100	98	95	98	97.8
September 5	Junior Team	The Lab	"Lemon" - N.E.R.D & Rihanna	100	99	100	100	99.8
September 5	Junior Team	The Rock Company	"Find Me" - Sigma ft. Birdy	91	92	91	92	91.5
September 5	Junior Team	Fabulous Sisters	"Wrecking Ball" - Miley Cyrus (Note: Fabulous Sisters used a remix of "Wrecking Ball" that incorporated Japanese sounds and beats.)	93	92	91	92	92.0
September 5	Upper Team	The Ruggeds	"Iron" - Woodkid	92	90	92	92	91.5
September 5	Upper Team	S-Rank	"Gas Pedal" - Sage the Gemini ft. IamSu	96	93	94	93	94.0
September 5	Upper Team	Poreotics	"Bangarang" - Skrillex ft. Sirah	85	87	87	88	86.8
September 5	Junior	Charity & Andres	"Castle" - Halsey	93	93	92	94	93.0
September 5	Junior	Jaxon Willard	"Blind Faith" - Johnny Manuel	87	89	87	88	87.8
September 5	Junior	Sean & Kaycee	"The Way I Do" - Bishop Briggs	91	92	95	91	92.3

== World Final ==
In the World Final, the final 4 division champions competed head to head to win the one million dollar prize. As with the previous 2 rounds, the judges and the host, Jenna, became mentors for each of the finalists. Derek worked with Charity & Andres, Jennifer worked with S-Rank, Jenna worked with Michael Dameski, and Ne-Yo worked with The Lab. Each of the 4 finalists performed twice. The first performance's music was chosen by their judge, or Jenna, and the second was chosen by the finalist. After each performance, the final scores were displayed on a leaderboard. The winner of the World Finals was determined by the judges combined average scores from both performances. After the first four performances, Season 1's Divisional Finalists Kinjaz and Keone & Mari performed with Derek Hough. Season 1's winner Les Twins also performed before the crowning. After the final performances, The Lab were announced as the winners of World of Dance; their final combined score of 97.5 beat out Michael Dameski by 1.5 points.

Table key
Key	Description
	Contestant(s) didn't win the competition

The Divisional Final scores
Upper		Upper Team		Junior		Junior Team	
Name	Score	Name	Score	Name	Score	Name	Score
Michael Dameski	97.8	S-Rank	94.0	Charity & Andres	93.0	The Lab	99.8

Contestant performances and Judges' scores
Date	Round	Dance Act	Performance song	Judges' score			
Date	Round	Dance Act	Performance song	Ne-Yo	Jennifer	Derek	Average
September 12	1	Charity & Andres	"Ain't No Sunshine (Lido remix)" - Bill Withers	92	96	95	94.3
September 12	1	S-Rank	"Headband" - B.o.B ft. 2 Chainz	91	95	93	93.0
September 12	1	Michael Dameski	"Dive" - Ed Sheeran	95	97	95	95.7
September 12	1	The Lab	"Work It" - Missy Elliott	97	97	97	97.0
September 12	2	S-Rank	"It's Goin' Down" - Yung Joc ft. Nitti	94	94	94	94.0
September 12	2	Charity & Andres	"Legendary" - Welshly Arms	96	93	94	94.3
September 12	2	Michael Dameski	"Survivor" - 2WEI	98	96	95	96.3
September 12	2	The Lab	"Waiting on the World to Change" - John Mayer	100	96	98	98.0

=== Final Scores ===
4th: S-Rank (93.5)

3rd: Charity & Andres (94.3)

2nd: Michael Dameski (96.0)

1st: The Lab (97.5)

== Highest Scoring Dances ==
Dance act	Division	Round	Music	Scores
Charity & Andres	Junior	The Duels	”Way Down We Go"—Kaleo	100.0 (100, 100, 100)
The Lab	Junior Team	Divisional Final	"Lemon"—N.E.R.D. & Rihanna	99.8 (100, 99^{1}, 100, 100)
Karen y Ricardo	Upper	The Qualifiers	"Pégate"—Ricky Martin	99.7 (100, 100, 99)
Karen y Ricardo	Upper	The Cut	"Caminaré"—Marc Anthony	99.0 (100, 99, 98)
Karen y Ricardo	Upper	The Duels	"La Malanga"—Mercado Negro	98.3 (97, 99, 99)
The Lab	Junior Team	The Cut	"Cold Water"—Major Lazer ft. Justin Bieber & MØ	98.3 (100, 97, 98)
The Lab	Junior Team	World Final	"Waiting on the World to Change"—John Mayer	98.0 (100, 96, 98)
Michael Dameski	Upper	Divisional Final	"Madness"—Ruelle	97.8 (100, 98^{1}, 95, 98)
The Lab	Junior Team	World Final	"Work It"—Missy Elliott	97.0 (97, 97, 97)
The Rock Company	Junior Team	The Qualifiers	"Imagine"—Emeli Sandé	96.7 (97, 97, 96)
Fabulous Sisters	Junior Team	The Cut	"Black and Gold"—Sam Sparro	96.3 (94, 97, 98)
Michael Dameski	Upper	World Final	"Survivor" - 2WEI	96.3 (98, 96, 95)
Desi Hoppers	Upper Team	The Qualifiers	"Shape of You"—Ed Sheeran	96.0 (98, 94, 96)
Jaxon Willard	Junior	The Duels	"Surprise Yourself"—Jack Garratt	96.0 (97, 98, 93)
Sean & Kaycee	Junior	The Qualifiers	"Silence"—Marshmello ft. Khalid	96.0 (97, 96, 95)
Fabulous Sisters	Junior Team	The Duels	"Shatter Me"— Lindsey Stirling	95.7 (95, 96, 96)
Vivian Ruiz	Junior	The Duels	"Came Here for Love" - Sigala	95.7 (95, 96, 96)
Michael Dameski	Upper	World Final	"Dive" - Ed Sheeran	95.7 (95, 97, 95)
Charity & Andres	Junior	The Qualifiers	"Say You Won't Let Go" - James Arthur	95.3 (97, 96, 93)
Karen y Ricardo	Upper	Divisional Final	"Bemba Colora" - Celia Cruz	95.3 (95, 94, 96, 96)

^1 Misty Copeland joined the Judges panel for Divisional Final round

== Ratings ==
Viewership and ratings per episode of World of Dance season 2
No.	Title	Air date	Rating/share (18–49)	Viewers (millions)
1	"The Qualifiers 1"	May 29, 2018	1.7/7	7.17
2	"The Qualifiers 2"	June 5, 2018	1.5/7	6.31
3	"The Qualifiers 3"	June 12, 2018	1.4/6	6.07
4	"The Qualifiers 4"	June 19, 2018	1.4/6	6.22
5	"The Qualifiers 5"	June 26, 2018	1.3/6	6.08
6	"The Qualifiers 6"	July 10, 2018	1.2/6	5.88
7	"The Qualifiers 7"	July 17, 2018	1.3/6	5.90
8	"The Qualifiers 8"	July 24, 2018	1.2/6	5.64
9	"The Duels 1"	July 25, 2018	1.0/5	4.94
10	"The Duels 2"	August 1, 2018	1.1/5	5.33
11	"The Duels 3"	August 8, 2018	1.1/5	4.75
12	"The Duels 4"	August 15, 2018	1.1/5	5.12
13	"The Cut 1"	August 22, 2018	1.2/5	5.05
14	"The Cut 2"	August 29, 2018	1.1/5	5.06
15	"Divisional Final"	September 5, 2018	1.1/5	5.17
16	"World Final"	September 12, 2018	1.1/5	5.58

== Contestants who appeared on previous season ==
- Andres Penate, of Charity & Andres, competed in season 1, as a member of 801Squad.
- Jaxon Willard competed in season 1, as a member of 801Squad.
- Melvin Timtim, of S-Rank, competed in season 1, as a member of Chapkis Dance Family.
- Josh Price, of S-Rank, competed in season 1, as a member of ImmaBEAST.
- The Lab competed in season 1. They added six new members by The Lab to the lineup of last season.
- Sean Lew, of Sean & Kaycee, competed in season 1, as a member of ImmaBEAST.
- Taylor Hatala, of Josh & Taylor, competed in season 1 with her dance partner Kyndall Harris as KynTay.
- Josh Beauchamp, of Josh & Taylor, competed in season 1, as a member of ImmaBEAST.
- Eva Igo, competed in season 1, reached the World Final and finished as runner-up to 'Les Twins'.
- Luka & Jenalyn competed in season 1.
- Royal Flux competed in season 1.
- DNA competed in season 1.
- D'Angelo Castro, of The Untouchables, competed in season 1 with his partner Amanda Carbajales.
