= Mercy (Lewis Capaldi song) =

Song by Lewis Capaldi

from the EP Bloom
- Released: 20 October 2017
- Length: 3:39
- Label: Virgin
- Songwriters: Lewis Capaldi; Daniel Nigro
- Producer: Dan Nigro

"Mercy" is a song by Scottish singer-songwriter Lewis Capaldi. It was released as a track on 20 October 2017 via Virgin Records from his debut extended play Bloom, which was released on that day. Although it failed to chart, the song is certified Silver in the United Kingdom.

== Background ==
Speaking to Genius about the song, Capaldi says the song "is about the moment someone is being told by their boyfriend or girlfriend that they don't want to be with them anymore... I think the worst way a relationship can end is when one person just one day realizes they don’t feel like they want to be with the other anymore... to be the person who’s still in love is a horrible position to be in. There’s nothing worse than seeing the other person not be as torn up about things coming to an end as you are."

== Live performances ==
Capaldi has performed the song during a BBC Music Introducing session at Maida Vale Studios in 2017.

== Certifications ==
Certifications for "Mercy"
Region	Certification	Certified units/sales
United Kingdom (BPI)	Silver	200,000^{‡}
^{‡} Sales+streaming figures based on certification alone.
