= Bloom (Lewis Capaldi EP) =

EP by Lewis Capaldi
- Released: 20 October 2017
- Genre: Pop
- Length: 14:37
- Label: Virgin EMI Records
- Producer: Dan Nigro; David Sneddon; Freeform Five; James Earp; Malay

Lewis Capaldi chronology
Bloom (2017)	Breach (2018)

Singles from Bloom
- 1. "Bruises" Released: 30 March 2017; 2. "Lost on You" Released: 7 July 2017; 3. "Fade" Released: 9 October 2017

Bloom is the debut extended play by Scottish singer-songwriter Lewis Capaldi. It was released as a digital download on 20 October 2017. It includes the singles "Fade", "Bruises", and "Lost on You", as well as the song "Mercy". Whilst the EP did not chart itself, "Bruises" charted at number six on the UK Singles Chart, (Note: "Bruises" also charted at number 2 on the Scottish Singles Sales Chart.) whilst "Fade" and "Lost on You" peaked at number 52 and number 38, respectively, on the UK Streaming Chart. (Note: "Fade" also charted at number 3 on the UK Physical Singles Chart, and number 13 on the UK Vinyl Singles Chart.) (Note: "Lost on You" also peaked at number 50 on the Scottish Singles Sales Chart.) Additionally, "Mercy" was certified Silver in the United Kingdom.

== Background ==
Announcing the extended play, Capaldi explains it as "a collection of songs that captures the last year of my life, and features songs I recorded in London, New York and Los Angeles. [The] Songs 'Fade' & 'Mercy' were recorded only a few months ago so they're almost as fresh to me as anybody else listening."

== Critical reception ==
Rolling Stone France said, "By relying on the risky but sometimes rewarding formula of extreme simplicity, the Scottish singer delivers his promise and follows in the footsteps of James Bay and LP." (Note: The article, in its entirety, is written in French.) Wonderland Magazine praised the EP, stating that "the four tracks tear at your heartstrings and leave you breathless. But, you know, in a good way." The Independent declared that they were "obsessed" with Bloom, and everything from it ranging "from the sombre piano to his soaring, powerful voice that is bound to draw comparisons to the likes of Paolo Nutini, Jack Savoretti and Tom Grennan."

== Track listing ==
No.	Title	Length
1.	"Fade"	4:04
2.	"Bruises"	3:38
3.	"Mercy"	3:39
4.	"Lost on You"	3:15
Total length:		14:37

== Release history ==
Release history for "Bloom"
Region	Date	Format(s)	Label(s)	Ref.
Various	20 October 2017	Digital download; streaming; CD; vinyl	Vertigo; Universal	
