= Tough (Lewis Capaldi song) =

Single by Lewis Capaldi

from the EP Breach
- Released: 8 June 2018
- Length: 3:49
- Label: Virgin

Lewis Capaldi singles chronology
"Rush" (2018)	"Tough" (2018)	"Grace" (2018)

"Tough" is a song by Scottish singer-songwriter Lewis Capaldi. It was released as a digital download on 8 June 2018 via Virgin Records as the lead single from his second extended play Breach. The song peaked at number 63 on the Scottish Singles Chart.

== Track listing ==
Digital download
No.	Title	Length
1.	"Tough"	3:49

== Charts ==
Chart (2018–19)	Peak position
Ireland (IRMA)	39
Scotland Singles (OCC)	63

== Certifications ==
Certifications for "Tough"
Region	Certification	Certified units/sales
Australia (ARIA)	Gold	35,000^{‡}
United Kingdom (BPI)	Gold	400,000^{‡}
^{‡} Sales+streaming figures based on certification alone.

== Release history ==
Region	Date	Format	Label
United Kingdom	8 June 2018	Digital download	Virgin
