= Yours, C Tour =

2025 concert tour by Camila Cabello

- World tour by Camila Cabello
- Location: Asia; Australia; Europe; South America
- Associated albums: C,XOXO
- Start date: June 28, 2025
- End date: September 14, 2025
- No. of shows: 17
- Website: www.camilacabello.com/live

Camila Cabello concert chronology
- Never Be the Same Tour (2018–2019); Yours, C Tour (2025); ...

The Yours, C Tour was the second headlining concert tour by American singer Camila Cabello, in support of her fourth studio album C,XOXO (2024). The tour commenced on June 28, 2025 in Le Barcarès, France and ended in São Paulo, Brazil on September 14, 2025, comprising seventeen dates so far across Europe, Asia, Australia and South America. It marks Cabello's first concert tour in over seven years. Up until this point, it is Cabello's first tour not including North American dates.

== Background ==
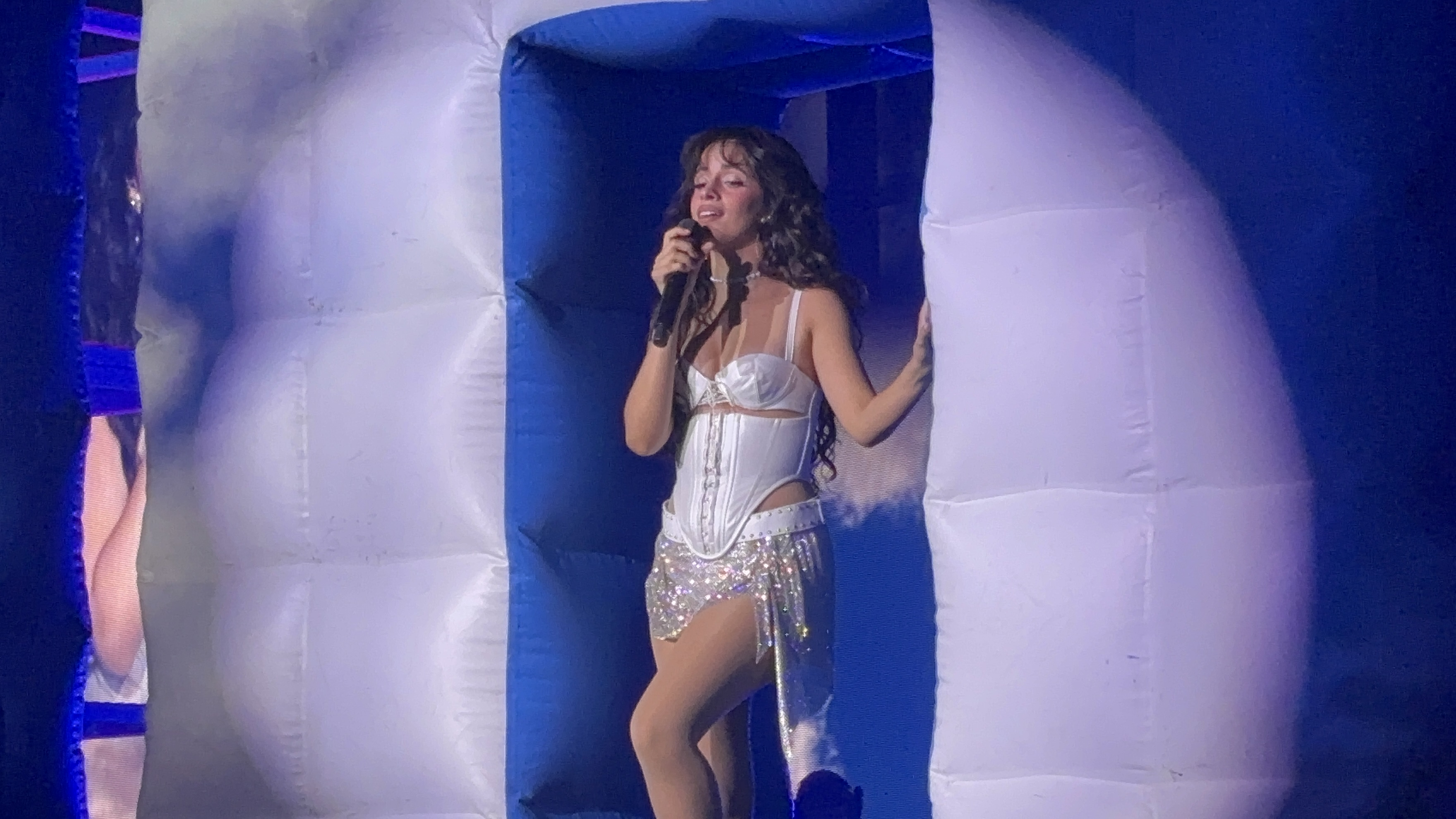
Camila Cabello performing at the Hordern Pavilion in Sydney, Australia on 30 August 2025.

Cabello released her second studio album Romance in December 2019. An accompanying concert tour across Europe and North America was expected to happen between May and October 2020, but was ultimately cancelled due to the COVID-19 pandemic. Her next record, Familia, which delved into her heritage and psyche, was released in April 2022 to great critical acclaim. It saw a great set of live performances including BBC's Live Lounge, Rock in Rio, and the opening ceremony of the 2022 UEFA Champions League final. She also served as the opening act for Coldplay's Music of the Spheres tour of Peru and Chile. Despite having a great promotional formula, no concert tour supporting the album was ever announced. Cabello began working on her forthcoming record in September 2022.

Promising to be a departure of her previous sound direction, a “discomfort of things that wouldn't give a neat, in-a-box answer”, her fourth studio album, C,XOXO, was released on 28 June 2024 to mixed-to-positive reviews. To promote the album, Cabello performed at a series of music festivals, including Glastonbury and Mawazine, the iHeart Radio Music Festival, and the 2024 MTV Video Music Awards among others. Cabello revealed that she would announce the dates of its accompanying tour at the 78th British Academy Film Awards red carpet.

The first selection of dates of the Yours, C Tour were announced on 17 February 2025. Tickets went on sale on February 21, 2025, with various presales that ran from February 18 to 20. On February 27, she was announced as part of the LaLaLa Festival in Indonesia. The same day she was announced as part of the Summer Sonic Festival in Tokyo, Japan. On March 24, Cabello announced two Australian headlining shows for the tour. On April 22, Cabello announced two more headlining shows for the Asian leg in Singapore and Kaohsiung. On May 9, the Spanish festival dates were cancelled alongside promotional appearances for the tour that were scheduled for May.

== Documentary ==
On August 1, 2025, Cabello announced a documentary documenting the journey during the European leg of the tour. The documentary was released on August 4, 2025 to Cabello's YouTube channel.

== Set list ==
This set list was taken from the show in Paris on June 30, 2025. It does not represent all shows throughout the tour.

1. "Shameless"
2. "Liar"
3. "Baby Pink"
4. "He Knows"
5. "Dade County Dreaming"
6. "Bad Kind of Butterflies"
7. "Never Be the Same"
8. "Chanel No. 5"
9. "Quiet"
10. "Used to This"
11. "My Oh My"
12. "Dream-Girls"
13. "Señorita"
14. "Bam Bam"
15. "B.O.A.T."
16. "Easy"
17. "Scar Tissue"
18. "Bad Things"
19. "June Gloom"
20. "Move" (remix)
21. "Havana"
22. "Don't Go Yet"
23. "I Luv It"

== Tour dates ==
List of concerts, showing date, city, country, venue, tickets sold, number of available tickets, and gross revenue
| Date (2025) | City | Country | Venue | Opening Act |
|---|---|---|---|---|
| June 28 (Note: This concert is part of Les Deferlantes.) | Le Barcarès | France | Les Jardins du Lydia | —N/a |
| June 30 | Paris | France | Le Zénith | —N/a |
| July 1 | Amsterdam | Netherlands | AFAS Live | —N/a |
| July 2 | Hamburg | Germany | Stadtpark Open Air | —N/a |
| July 4 (Note: This concert is part of Ruisrock.) | Turku | Finland | Ruissalo | —N/a |
| July 5 (Note: This concert is part of Open'er Festival.) | Gdynia | Poland | Gdynia-Kosakowo Airport | —N/a |
| July 8 | London | England | Eventim Apollo | —N/a |
| July 9 | Dublin | Ireland | 3Arena | —N/a |
| August 14 | Kaohsiung | Taiwan | Kaohsiung Music Center | —N/a |
| August 16 (Note: This concert is part of Summer Sonic Festival.) | Osaka | Japan | Expo Commemoration Park | —N/a |
| August 17 (Note: This concert is part of Summer Sonic Festival.) | Chiba (Note: Promoted as Tokyo in promotion material.) | Japan | Zozo Marine Stadium | —N/a |
| August 22 (Note: This concert is part of LaLaLa Festival.) | Jakarta | Indonesia | Jakarta International Expo | —N/a |
| August 24 (Note: This concert is part of Summer Sonic Festival.) | Bangkok | Thailand | Impact Challenger Hall | —N/a |
| August 27 | Melbourne | Australia | Margaret Court Arena | Cat & Calmell |
| August 30 | Sydney | Australia | Hordern Pavilion | Cat & Calmell |
| September 14 (Note: This concert is part of The Town.) | São Paulo | Brazil | Interlagos Circuit | —N/a |

== Cancelled dates ==
List of cancelled concerts
| Date (2025) | City | Country | Venue | Reason |
|---|---|---|---|---|
| June 21 (Note: This concert was part of Starlite Occident Festival.) | Marbella | Spain | Auditorio Starlite | Unforeseen circumstances |
| June 24 (Note: This concert was part of Alma Occident Festival.) | Barcelona | Spain | Poble Espanyol | Unforeseen circumstances |
| June 25 (Note: This concert was part of Alma Occident Festival.) | Madrid | Spain | Auditorio Enrique Tierno Galván | Unforeseen circumstances |
| August 12 | Singapore | | The Star Theatre | Scheduling conflict |
