= Godspeed (Camila Cabello song) =

- "Official Live Performance" cover

Single by Camila Cabello

from the album C,XOXO (Magic City Edition)
- Released: September 4, 2024
- Studio: Studio 26 (Miami); The Sanctuary (Bahamas); Interscope (Santa Monica)
- Length: 3:36
- Label: Geffen; Interscope
- Songwriters: Camila Cabello; Jasper Harris; Pablo Díaz-Reixa; Mark Williams; Raul Cubina; Zack Sekoff
- Producers: El Guincho; Jasper Harris

Camila Cabello singles chronology
"Hot Uptown" (2024)	"Godspeed" (2024)	"Move" (2024)

Music video
- "Godspeed" on YouTube

"Godspeed" (stylized in all caps) is a song by American singer Camila Cabello from the deluxe edition of her fourth studio album, C,XOXO (Magic City Edition) (2024). Cabello co-wrote the song with Jasper Harris, Pablo Díaz-Reixa (El Guincho), Mark Williams, Raul Cubina, and Zack Sekoff, while Harris and Guincho produced the track.

== Live performances ==
Cabello debuted the performance of the song along with "June Gloom" at the 2024 MTV Video Music Awards on September 11, 2024. Later, Cabello performed the song at BBC Radio 1's Live Lounge on October 1, 2024.

== Personnel ==
Credits adapted from Tidal

- Camila Cabello – vocals, songwriting
- Pablo Díaz-Reixa – programming, drums, songwriting
- Jasper Harris – synthesizer, bass, songwriting
- Mark Williams – synthesizer
- Raul Cubina – synthesizer
- Zack Sekoff – songwriting
- Dale Becker – mastering
- Katie Harvey – mastering assistance
- Noah McCorkle – mastering assistance
- Jon Castelli – mixing
- Salvador "Better Call Sal" Majail – engineering
- Bart Schoudel – vocal production, engineering
- Antonio "Dj Fuse" Olivera – engineering assistance
- Anthony D'Annunzio – production coordinating
- Emme Lehmann Boddicker – production coordinating, A&R coordinating
- John Janick – production coordinating, A&R
- Roger Gold – production coordinating
- Sam French – production coordinating
- Sam Riback – production coordinating, A&R
- Vanessa Angiuli – production coordinating, A&R
- Dale Becker – studio personnel

== Charts ==
Chart performance for "Godspeed"
Chart (2024)	Peak position
UK Singles Sales (Official Charts Company)	93
