= List of awards and nominations received by Camila Cabello =

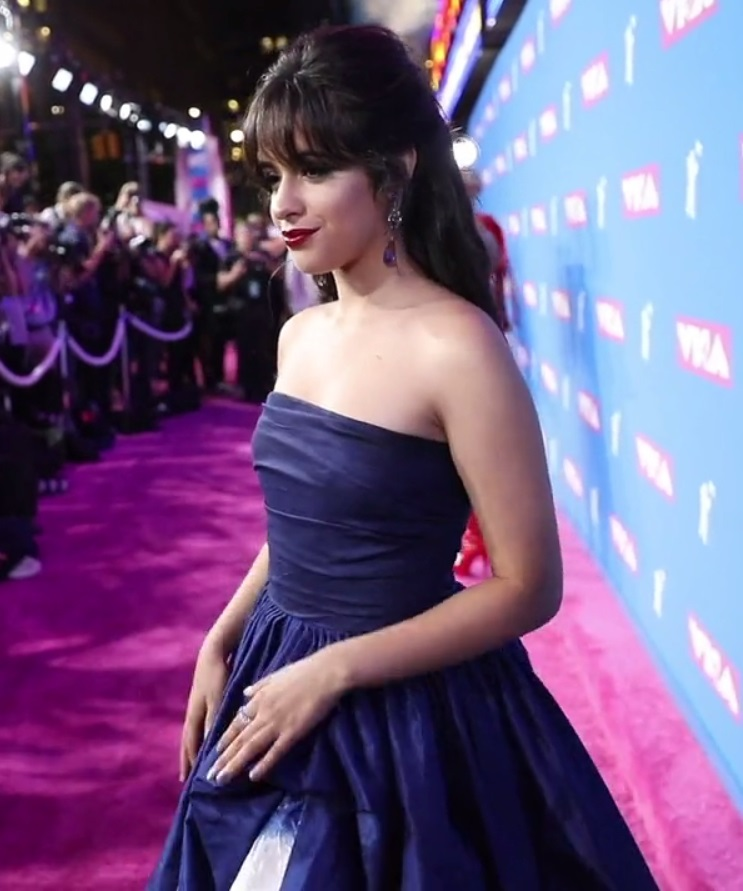
- Cabello as Artist of the Year at VMA 2018
Awards and nominations
Award	Wins	Nominations
American Music Awards	5	6
ARIA Music Awards	1	1
ARIA Charts Awards	2	2
Asia Pop 40 Awards	2	2
BBC Radio 1 Teen Awards	0	2
Beano Awards	1	1
Billboard Music Awards	2	7
Billboard Live Music Awards	1	1
Billboard Women in Music	1	1
BMI Pop Awards	9	9
BMI London Awards	5	5
Bravo Otto	2	3
BRIT Awards	0	2
Echo Awards	0	2
GAFFA Awards	0	2
Gaon Chart Awards	1	1
Global Awards	2	5
Grammy Awards	0	4
Guinness World Records	1	1
Hispanic Federation Gala	1	1
iHeartRadio Much Music Video Awards	5	11
iHeartRadio Music Awards	5	19
iHeartRadio Titanium Award	3	3
Juno Awards	1	2
Latin American Music Awards	1	2
Latin Grammy Awards	2	4
LOS40 Music Awards	1	10
MAD Video Music Awards	1	1
MBC Plus X Genie Music Awards	0	1
Melon Music Awards	1	5
MTV Europe Music Awards	7	16
MTV Millennial Awards	2	3
MTV Millennial Awards Brazil	1	3
MTV Video Music Awards	7	18
MTV Video Music Awards Japan	1	3
MTV Video Play Awards	1	1
Nickelodeon Kids' Choice Awards	4	6
Nickelodeon Kids’ Choice Awards Abu Dhabi	0	1
Meus Prêmios Nick	2	6
Nickelodeon Argentina Kids' Choice Awards	2	3
Nickelodeon Colombia Kids' Choice Awards	2	2
Nickelodeon Mexico Kids' Choice Awards	1	6
NRJ Music Awards	3	10
Official Charts Company	2	2
People's Choice Awards	2	10
Prêmio Jovem Brasileiro	1	1
Premios Juventud	2	6
Radio Disney Music Awards	9	10
RTHK International Pop Poll Awards	3	5
Save the Children Awards	1	1
Shorty Awards	1	2
Spotify Awards	0	2
Streamy Awards	0	1
Swiss Music Awards	1	1
Teen Choice Awards	14	32
Telehit Awards	1	6
The Cybersmile Foundation Awards	1	1
The Lockdown Awards	1	3
Variety Power of Women Awards	1	1
WDM Radio Awards	1	1
YouTube Creator Awards	3	3
- Totals
Wins	129
Nominations	275
Pending	0

Cuban-born Mexican-American singer Camila Cabello has received multiple nominations and won more than 136 awards including as a member of American girl group Fifth Harmony. This includes wins for six American Music Awards, two Billboard Music Awards, two Latin Grammy Awards, seven MTV Video Music Awards and nominations for two Brit Awards and four Grammy Awards.

Her debut album Camila was released in 2018 and debuted at No.1 on the US Billboard 200 Chart. The album spawned a No.1 single "Havana" and a top 10 single "Never Be the Same" on Billboard Hot 100. In August, she was presented Artist of the Year at the 2018 MTV Video Music Awards, and won a MTV Video Music Award for Video of the Year for "Havana", the video directed by Dave Meyers. In October, she won New Artist of the Year at the 46th Annual American Music Awards, plus Collaboration of the Year, Video of the Year and Favorite Pop/Rock Song. In November, she was presented International Breakthrough of the Year at the NRJ Music Awards. The same year, she has also won a Billboard Music Award, four American Music Awards, five MTV Europe Music Awards, two MTV Video Music Awards, an NRJ Music Award two iHeartRadio Music Awards, and three iHeartRadio Much Music Video Awards.

In December 2018, Cabello was nominated for two awards at the 61st Annual Grammy Awards, including Best Pop Vocal Album for Camila, and Best Pop Solo Performance for the live version of "Havana", becoming her first two nominations. Cabello was also nominated for International Female Solo Artist at the 2019 Brit Awards.

Cabello alongside Shawn Mendes took home two VMAs at the 2019 MTV Video Music Awards for their single "Señorita" including Best Collaboration and Best Cinematography.

In September 2019, Cabello was nominated for three awards at the 20th Annual Latin Grammys for "Mi Persona Favorita", her collaboration with Alejandro Sanz. In late November, she won Record of the Year and Best Pop Song.

== Awards and nominations ==
Award	Year (Note: Indicates the year of ceremony. Each year is linked to the article about the awards held that year, wherever possible.)	Recipient(s) and nominee(s)	Category	Result	Ref.
American Music Awards	2018	Camila Cabello	New Artist of the Year	Won	
American Music Awards	2018	Camila Cabello	Favorite Pop/Rock Female Artist	Nominated	
American Music Awards	2018	"Havana"	Collaboration of the Year	Won	
American Music Awards	2018	"Havana"	Video of the Year	Won	
American Music Awards	2018	"Havana"	Favorite Pop/Rock Song	Won	
American Music Awards	2019	"Señorita"	Collaboration of the Year	Won	
ARIA Music Awards	2018	Camila Cabello	Best International Artist	Won	
ARIA Charts	2017	"Havana"	ARIA #1 Single Chart award	Won	
ARIA Charts	2019	"Señorita"	ARIA #1 Single Chart award	Won	
Asia Pop 40 Awards	2019	Camila Cabello	Artist of the Year	Won	
Asia Pop 40 Awards	2019	"Havana"	Song of the Year	Won	
BBC Radio 1 Teen Awards	2018	Camila Cabello	Best International Solo Artist	Nominated	
BBC Radio 1 Teen Awards	2019	"Señorita"	Best Single	Nominated	
Beano Awards	2019	"Señorita"	Best Song	Won	
Billboard Latin Women in Music	2024	Camila Cabello	Global Impact Award	Won	
Billboard Music Awards	2017	"Bad Things"	Top Rap Collaboration	Nominated	
Billboard Music Awards	2018	Camila Cabello	Top New Artist	Nominated	
Billboard Music Awards	2018	Camila Cabello	Chart Achievement	Won	
Billboard Music Awards	2018	Camila Cabello	Top Female Artist	Nominated	
Billboard Music Awards	2018	"Havana"	Top Collaboration	Nominated	
Billboard Music Awards	2020	"Señorita"	Top Collaboration	Won	
Billboard Music Awards	2020	"Señorita"	Top Hot 100 Song	Nominated	
Billboard Live Music Awards	2019	Verizon Up x Shawn Mendes x Camilla Cabello Customer Loyalty Promotion	Concert and Marketing Promotions Award	Won	
Billboard Women in Music	2017	Camila Cabello	Breakthrough Artist	Won	
BMI Awards	2018	"Bad Things"	Award Winning Songs (Note: Awards and nominations Cabello has received as songwriter.)	Won	
BMI Awards	2018	"All in My Head (Flex)"	Award Winning Songs	Won	
BMI Awards	2019	"Havana"	Award Winning Songs	Won	
BMI Awards	2019	"Never Be The Same"	Award Winning Songs	Won	
BMI Awards	2020	"Beautiful"	Award Winning Songs	Won	
BMI Awards	2020	"Consequences"	Award Winning Songs	Won	
BMI Awards	2020	"Señorita"	Award Winning Songs	Won	
BMI Awards	2021	"My Oh My"	Award Winning Songs	Won	
BMI Awards	2021	"South of Border" (with Ed Sheeran & Cardi B)	Award Winning Songs	Won	
BMI Awards	2023	"Bam Bam" (with Ed Sheeran)	Award Winning Songs	Won	
BMI London Awards	2019	"Never Be the Same"	Song of the Year	Won	
BMI London Awards	2019	"Never Be the Same"	Award Winning Songs	Won	
BMI London Awards	2019	"Crying in the Club"	Award Winning Songs	Won	
BMI London Awards	2020	"Liar"	Award Winning Songs	Won	
BMI London Awards	2020	"Señorita"	Award Winning Songs	Won	
BMI London Awards	2021	"South of the Border"	Award Winning Songs	Won	
Bravo Otto	2019	Camila Cabello	International Singer	Nominated	
BreakTudo Awards	2018	Camila Cabello	International Female Artist	Won	
BreakTudo Awards	2018	"Camila"	Album of the Year	Won	
BreakTudo Awards	2018	"Havana"	Hit of the Year	Won	
BreakTudo Awards	2018	Never Be the Same Tour	Summer Tour	Won	
BreakTudo Awards	2019	Camilizers	International Fandom	Nominated	
BreakTudo Awards	2019	"Señorita"	International Hit	Nominated	
BreakTudo Awards	2019	"Señorita"	Video of the Year	Nominated	
BreakTudo Awards	2020	"Shameless"	Hymn of the Year	Nominated	
BreakTudo Awards	2022	"Bam Bam"	International Hit	Won	
BRIT Awards	2019	Camila Cabello	International Female Solo Artist	Nominated	
BRIT Awards	2020	Camila Cabello	International Female Solo Artist	Nominated	
Capricho Awards	2017	"Havana"	International Hit	Won	
Capricho Awards	2017	"Havana"	International Music Video	Won	
Echo Awards	2018	Camila Cabello	Best International Newcomer	Nominated	
Echo Awards	2018	Camila Cabello	Best International Artist	Nominated	
GAFFA Awards (Denmark)	2019	Camila Cabello	Best Foreign New Act	Nominated	
GAFFA Awards (Sweden)	2019	Camila Cabello	Best Foreign New Act	Nominated	
Gaon Chart Music Awards	2018	"Havana"	International Song of the Year	Won	
Global Awards	2018	"Havana"	Best Song	Nominated	
Global Awards	2018	Camila Cabello	Best Female	Won	
Global Awards	2018	Camila Cabello	Best Pop	Nominated	
Global Awards	2020	Camila Cabello	Best Female	Won	
Global Awards	2020	"Señorita"	Best Song of 2019	Nominated	
Grammy Awards	2019	"Havana (Live)"	Best Pop Solo Performance	Nominated	
Grammy Awards	2019	Camila	Best Pop Vocal Album	Nominated	
Grammy Awards	2020	"Señorita" (with Shawn Mendes)	Best Pop Duo/Group Performance	Nominated	
Grammy Awards	2023	"Bam Bam" (with Ed Sheeran)	Best Pop Duo/Group Performance	Nominated	
Guinness World Records	2020	"Havana"	Most streamed track on Spotify by female artist	Won	
Hispanic Federation Gala	2022	Camila Cabello	Premio Orgullo	Won	
Hits FM Music Awards	2018	Camila Cabello	New Artist of the Year	Won	
Hollywood Music in Media Awards	2022	"Take Me Back Home" (with Hans Zimmer)	Original Song/Score - Trailer	Won	
Hollywood Music Video Awards	2025	Best Short Form Visualizer	C,XOXO	Won	
iHeartRadio Much Music Video Awards	2016	"I Know What You Did Last Summer"	Fan Fave Video	Won	
iHeartRadio Much Music Video Awards	2016	"I Know What You Did Last Summer"	Best Pop Video	Won	
iHeartRadio Much Music Video Awards	2016	"I Know What You Did Last Summer"	Video of the Year	Nominated	
iHeartRadio Much Music Video Awards	2017	Camila Cabello	Best New International Artist	Won	
iHeartRadio Much Music Video Awards	2018	Camila Cabello	Best Pop Artist of Group	Nominated	
iHeartRadio Much Music Video Awards	2018	Camila Cabello	Artist of the Year	Nominated	
iHeartRadio Much Music Video Awards	2018	Camila Cabello	Fan Fave Artist	Nominated	
iHeartRadio Much Music Video Awards	2018	"Havana"	Fan Fave Single	Nominated	
IHeartRadio Music Awards	2016	"Uptown Funk" (featuring Jasmine V, Jacob Whitesides, and Mahogany Lox)	Best Cover Song	Won	
IHeartRadio Music Awards	2017	Camila Cabello	Best Solo Breakout	Nominated	
IHeartRadio Music Awards	2018	Camila Cabello	Fangirls Award	Won	
IHeartRadio Music Awards	2018	Camila Cabello	Best New Pop Artist	Nominated	
IHeartRadio Music Awards	2018	Camila Cabello	Best Fan Army	Nominated	
IHeartRadio Music Awards	2018	Camila Cabello	Best Solo Breakout	Nominated	
IHeartRadio Music Awards	2018	"Say You Won't Let Go"	Best Cover Song	Nominated	
IHeartRadio Music Awards	2018	"Havana (Remix)"	Best Remix	Nominated	
IHeartRadio Music Awards	2019	Camila Cabello	Female Artist of the Year	Nominated	
IHeartRadio Music Awards	2019	Camilizers	Best Fan Army	Nominated	
IHeartRadio Music Awards	2019	"Consequences"	Best Lyric	Won	
IHeartRadio Music Awards	2020	"Señorita"	Song Of The Year	Nominated	
IHeartRadio Music Awards	2020	"Señorita"	Best Collaboration	Won	
IHeartRadio Music Awards	2020	"Señorita"	Best Music Video	Nominated	
IHeartRadio Music Awards	2020	"Señorita"	Best Lyrics	Nominated	
IHeartRadio Music Awards	2020	Camilizers	Best Fan Army	Nominated	
IHeartRadio Music Awards	2020	"Someone You Loved"	Best Cover Song	Nominated	
IHeartRadio Music Awards	2022	"Good 4 U"	Best Cover Song	Won	
iHeartRadio Titanium Award	2019	"Havana"	1 Billion Total Audience Spins on iHeartRadio Stations	Won	
iHeartRadio Titanium Award	2019	"Never Be the Same"	1 Billion Total Audience Spins on iHeartRadio Stations	Won	
iHeartRadio Titanium Award	2021	"Señorita"	1 Billion Total Audience Spins on iHeartRadio Stations	Won	
Juno Awards	2019	Camila	International Album of the Year	Nominated	
Juno Awards	2020	"Señorita"	Single of the Year	Won	
Latin American Music Awards	2018	Camila Cabello	Favorite Crossover Artist	Won	
Latin American Music Awards	2022	Camila Cabello	Social Artist of the Year	Nominated	
Latin American Music Awards	2024	"Ambulancia" (with Camilo)	Best Tropical Collaboration	Nominated	
Latin Grammy Awards	2017	"Hey Ma"	Best Urban Song	Nominated	
Latin Grammy Awards	2019	"Mi Persona Favorita" (with Alejandro Sanz)	Record of the Year	Won	
Latin Grammy Awards	2019	"Mi Persona Favorita" (with Alejandro Sanz)	Song of the Year	Nominated	
Latin Grammy Awards	2019	"Mi Persona Favorita" (with Alejandro Sanz)	Best Pop Song	Won	
Latin Grammy Awards	2023	"Ambulancia" (with Camilo)	Best Tropical Song	Nominated	
LOS40 Music Awards	2017	Camila Cabello	Lo+40 Best Artist Award	Won	
LOS40 Music Awards	2018	Camila	International Album of the Year	Nominated	
LOS40 Music Awards	2018	"Havana"	International Song of the Year	Nominated	
LOS40 Music Awards	2019	"Mi Persona Favorita"	Best Spanish Song	Nominated	
LOS40 Music Awards	2019	"Señorita"	Best International Song	Nominated	
LOS40 Music Awards	2021	"Don't Go Yet"	Best International Music Video	Nominated	
LOS40 Music Awards	2022	Camila Cabello	Best International Act	Nominated	
LOS40 Music Awards	2022	Familia	Best International Album	Nominated	
LOS40 Music Awards	2022	"Bam Bam" (with Ed Sheeran)	Best International Song	Nominated	
LOS40 Music Awards	2022	"Bam Bam" (with Ed Sheeran)	Best International Collaboration	Nominated	
MAD Video Music Awards	2018	"Havana"	Mad Radio International Song of the Year	Won	
MBC Plus X Genie Music Awards	2018	Camila Cabello	Best International Artist	Nominated	
Melon Music Awards	2018	"Camila"	Best Album Award	Nominated	
Melon Music Awards	2018	"Havana"	Best Song Award	Nominated	
Melon Music Awards	2018	"Havana"	Best Pop Award	Won	
Melon Music Awards	2019	"Señorita"	Best Pop Track	Nominated	
MTV Europe Music Awards	2017	Camila Cabello	Best Pop	Won	
MTV Europe Music Awards	2018	"Havana"	Best Song	Won	
MTV Europe Music Awards	2018	"Havana"	Best Video	Won	
MTV Europe Music Awards	2018	Camila Cabello	Best Artist	Won	
MTV Europe Music Awards	2018	Camila Cabello	Best Pop	Nominated	
MTV Europe Music Awards	2018	Camila Cabello	Biggest Fans	Nominated	
MTV Europe Music Awards	2018	Camila Cabello	Best US Act	Won	
MTV Europe Music Awards	2019	"Señorita"	Best Song	Nominated	
MTV Europe Music Awards	2019	"Señorita"	Best Collaboration	Nominated	
MTV Europe Music Awards	2019	Camila Cabello	Best Pop	Nominated	
MTV Europe Music Awards	2024	Camila Cabello	Best Pop	Nominated	
MTV Millennial Awards	2017	Camila Cabello	Instagramer Global	Won	
MTV Millennial Awards	2018	Camila Cabello	Instagramer Global	Nominated	
MTV Millennial Awards	2018	"Havana"	Hit Global	Won	
MTV Millennial Awards Brazil	2018	"Havana"	International Hit	Won	
MTV Millennial Awards Brazil	2018	Camila Cabello	Fandom of the Year	Nominated	
MTV Millennial Awards Brazil	2018	Camila Cabello and Fifth Harmony	Shade of the Year	Nominated	
MTV Video Music Awards	2017	"OMG"	Song of Summer	Nominated	
MTV Video Music Awards	2018	"Havana"	Video of the Year	Won	
MTV Video Music Awards	2018	"Havana"	Song of the Year	Nominated	
MTV Video Music Awards	2018	"Havana"	Best Pop Video	Nominated	
MTV Video Music Awards	2018	"Havana"	Best Choreography	Nominated	
MTV Video Music Awards	2018	Camila Cabello	Artist of the Year	Won	
MTV Video Music Awards	2019	"Señorita"	Best Collaboration	Won	
MTV Video Music Awards	2019	"Señorita"	Best Cinematography	Won	
MTV Video Music Awards	2019	"Señorita"	Best Art Direction	Nominated	
MTV Video Music Awards	2019	"Señorita"	Best Choreography	Nominated	
MTV Video Music Awards	2019	"Señorita"	Song of Summer	Nominated	
MTV Video Music Awards	2020	"My Oh My"	Best Cinematography	Nominated	
MTV Video Music Awards	2021	"Don't Go Yet"	Song of Summer	Nominated	
MTV Video Music Awards	2022	"Bam Bam"	Best Cinematography	Nominated	
MTV Video Music Awards	2024	Camila Cabello	Best Pop	Nominated	
MTV Video Music Awards	2024	I Luv It	Best Trending Video	Nominated	
MTV Video Play Awards	2019	"Señorita"	Top 20 Music Videos	Won	
Nickelodeon Kids’ Choice Awards Abu Dhabi	2019	Camila Cabello	Favorite International Star	Nominated	
Nickelodeon Kids' Choice Awards	2018	Camila Cabello	Favorite Breakout Artist	Won	
Nickelodeon Kids' Choice Awards	2019	Camila Cabello	Favorite Female Artist	Nominated	
Nickelodeon Kids' Choice Awards	2020	"Señorita"	Favorite Music Collaboration	Won	
Nickelodeon Kids' Choice Awards	2022	Camila Cabello as Cinderella in Cinderella	Favorite Movie Actress	Nominated	
Meus Prêmios Nick	2017	"Hey Ma"	Favorite Collaboration	Won	
Meus Prêmios Nick	2017	Camila Cabello	Favorite International Artist	Nominated	
Meus Prêmios Nick	2018	Camila Cabello	Favorite International Artist	Nominated	
Meus Prêmios Nick	2019	"Señorita"	Favorite International Hit	Nominated	
Meus Prêmios Nick	2020	Camila Cabello	Favorite International Artist	Nominated	
Nickelodeon Argentina Kids' Choice Awards	2017	"Hey Ma"	Favorite Collaboration	Won	
Nickelodeon Argentina Kids' Choice Awards	2017	Camila Cabello	Favorite International Artist or Group	Won	
Nickelodeon Argentina Kids' Choice Awards	2018	Camila Cabello	Favorite International Artist or Group	Nominated	
Nickelodeon Colombia Kids' Choice Awards	2017	"Hey Ma"	Favorite Collaboration	Won	
Nickelodeon Colombia Kids' Choice Awards	2017	Camila Cabello	Favorite International Artist or Group	Won	
Nickelodeon Mexico Kids' Choice Awards	2017	"Hey Ma"	Favorite Collaboration	Nominated	
Nickelodeon Mexico Kids' Choice Awards	2017	Camila Cabello	Favorite International Artist or Group	Nominated	
Nickelodeon Mexico Kids' Choice Awards	2018	Camila Cabello	Favorite International Artist or Group	Won	
Nickelodeon Mexico Kids' Choice Awards	2018	"Havana"	Favorite Hit	Nominated	
Nickelodeon Mexico Kids' Choice Awards	2022	Camila Cabello	Favorite Global Artist	Nominated	
Nickelodeon Mexico Kids' Choice Awards	2022	Bam Bam	International Hit of the Year	Nominated	
NRJ Music Awards	2018	Camila Cabello	International Breakthrough of the Year	Won	
NRJ Music Awards	2019	Camila Cabello	International Female Artist of the Year	Nominated	
NRJ Music Awards	2019	Camila Cabello	International Duo/Group of the Year	Nominated	
NRJ Music Awards	2019	"Señorita" (with Shawn Mendes)	International Song of the Year	Won	
NRJ Music Awards	2021	Camila Cabello	International Female Artist of the Year	Nominated	
NRJ Music Awards	2022	Camila Cabello	International Female Artist of the Year	Nominated	
NRJ Music Awards	2022	"Bam Bam"	International Song of the Year	Nominated	
NRJ Music Awards	2022	"Bam Bam"	International Collaboration of the Year	Won	
NRJ Music Awards	2022	"Mon Amour"	Francophone Clip	Nominated	
Official Charts Company	2017	"Havana"	Official Number 1 single award	Won	
Official Charts Company	2019	"Señorita"	Official Number 1 single award	Won	
People's Choice Awards	2018	Camila Cabello	Female Artist of 2018	Nominated	
People's Choice Awards	2018	"Never Be the Same"	Music Video of 2018	Nominated	
People's Choice Awards	2018	Camila	Album of 2018	Nominated	
People's Choice Awards	2019	Camila Cabello	Female Artist of 2019	Nominated	
People's Choice Awards	2019	"Señorita"	Song of 2019	Won	
People's Choice Awards	2019	"Señorita"	Music Video of 2019	Nominated	
People's Choice Awards	2022	Camila Cabello	Female Artist of 2022	Nominated	
People's Choice Awards	2022	"Bam Bam"	Collaboration of the Year	Nominated	
Premios Juventud	2016	"I Know What You Did Last Summer"	Favorite Hit	Nominated	
Premios Juventud	2017	"Hey Ma"	Best Song to Dance	Nominated	
Premios Juventud	2023	Camila Cabello	Agent of Change	Won	
Prêmio Jovem Brasileiro	2018	"Havana"	Melhor Single	Won	
Radio Disney Music Awards	2017	"Bad Things"	Best Collaboration	Won	
Radio Disney Music Awards	2018	Camila Cabello	Breakout Artist of the Year	Won	
Radio Disney Music Awards	2018	"Havana"	Song of the Year	Won	
RTHK International Pop Poll Awards	2018	Camila Cabello	Top Female Artist (Bronze)	Won	
RTHK International Pop Poll Awards	2018	"Havana"	Top 10 International Songs	Won	
RTHK International Pop Poll Awards	2020	"Señorita"	Top 10 International Songs	Won	
RTHK International Pop Poll Awards	2022	Camila Cabello	Top Female Artist	Nominated	
RTHK International Pop Poll Awards	2022	"Bam Bam"	Top 10 International Songs	Nominated	
Save the Children	2019	Camila Cabello	Voice Award	Won	
SEC Awards	2022	Camila Cabello	Best Actress (International)	Won	
Spotify Awards	2020	Camila Cabello	Most-Streamed Female Artist – For Users From 13 to 17 Years Old	Nominated	
Spotify Awards	2020	"Mi Persona Favorita"	Monday's Song	Nominated	
Streamy Awards	2015	"Uptown Funk" (featuring Jasmine V, Jacob Whitesides, and Mahogany Lox)	Cover Song	Nominated	
Swiss Music Awards	2019	Camila Cabello	Best Breaking Act International	Won	
Teen Choice Awards	2016	"I Know What You Did Last Summer"	Choice Music: Breakup Song	Nominated	
Teen Choice Awards	2017	"Crying in the Club"	Choice Single: Female Artist	Won	
Teen Choice Awards	2017	"Know No Better"	Choice Electronic/Dance Song	Won	
Teen Choice Awards	2017	"Hey Ma"	Choice Latin Song	Nominated	
Teen Choice Awards	2017	Camila Cabello	Choice Summer Female Artist	Won	
Teen Choice Awards	2017	Camila Cabello	Choice Female Hottie	Won	
Teen Choice Awards	2018	Camila Cabello	Choice Female Artist	Won	
Teen Choice Awards	2018	Camila Cabello	Choice Summer Female Artist	Won	
Teen Choice Awards	2018	"Havana"	Choice Single: Female Artist	Won	
Teen Choice Awards	2019	"Find U Again"	Choice Electronic/Dance Song	Nominated	
Teen Choice Awards	2019	"Señorita"	Choice Summer Song	Won	
Telehit Awards	2017	Camila Cabello	Female Soloist of the Year	Nominated	
Telehit Awards	2018	"Havana"	Song of the Year	Nominated	
Telehit Awards	2019	"Señorita"	Best Anglo Video	Nominated	
Telehit Awards	2019	"Señorita"	Best Anglo Song	Nominated	
The Cybersmile Foundation	2021	Camila Cabello	July's Cybersmiler of the Month Award	Won	
The Lockdown Awards	2020	"What A Wonderful World"	Digital Chemistry: Favorite Duet	Won	
The Lockdown Awards	2020	"Beautiful Day (Finneas Remix)," Dear Class of 2020	Stronger Together: Favorite Group / All-Star Performance (with Finneas, Ben Platt, Chris Martin, Cynthia Erivo, Khalid, Leon Bridges, Noah Cyrus, Tove Lo & Ty Dolla $ign)	Nominated	
The Lockdown Awards	2020	"Beautiful Day (Finneas Remix)," Dear Class of 2020	Zoom Tune: Zoom Performance (with Finneas, Ben Platt, Chris Martin, Cynthia Erivo, Khalid, Leon Bridges Noah Cyrus, Tove Lo, & Ty Dolla $ign)	Nominated	
Variety Power of Women Awards	2022	Camila Cabello	Power of Women	Won	
WDM Radio Awards	2018	"Know No Better"	Best Trending Track	Won	
YouTube Creator Awards	2016	Camila Cabello	Silver Creator Award	Won	
YouTube Creator Awards	2017	Camila Cabello	Gold Creator Award	Won	
YouTube Creator Awards	2019	Camila Cabello	Diamond Creator Award	Won	
