= Piratas de Sudamérica, Vol. 1 =

2010 EP by el Guincho

EP by El Guincho
- Released: 12 July 2010
- Length: 15:35
- Language: Spanish
- Label: Young Turks

El Guincho chronology
Alegranza (2007)	Piratas de Sudamérica, Vol. 1 (2010)	Pop Negro (2010)

Professional ratings
Review scores
Source	Rating
Pitchfork	7.7/10
PopMatters	7/10
Tiny Mix Tapes	4/5 marks

Piratas de Sudamérica, Vol. 1 (transl. "Pirates of South America, Vol. 1") is the debut extended play (EP) by Spanish musician El Guincho. It was released on 12 July 2010 by Young Turks.

== Track listing ==
Credits adapted from Tidal.

Piratas de Sudamérica, Vol. 1 track listing
No.	Title	Writer(s)	Length
1.	"Hindou"	Armando Valdespi; Robert Chamfleury	2:58
2.	"Cuerpo sin Alma"	Traditional	2:23
3.	"Mientes" (with Julieta Venegas)	Miguel Matamoros	3:19
4.	"Frutas del Caney"	Félix Benjamín Caignet	3:01
5.	"Marimba" (with Adrián de Alfonso)	Austin Lara Aguirra del Pino	3:54
Total length:			15:35
