= Michael Bublé's Christmas in the City =

2021 American television special

- Country of origin: United States
- Original language: English

Production
- Executive producers: Lorne Michaels; Michael Bublé; Bruce Allen; Erin Doyle; Tom Corson
- Production location: Studio 8H in Rockefeller Center

Original release
- Network: NBC
- Release: December 6, 2021

Michael Bublé's Christmas in the City is an American television special, which aired on NBC on December 6, 2021. Hosted by Michael Bublé, the program featured musical performances of songs from Bublé's 2011 album Christmas to celebrate its tenth anniversary.

== Performances ==
Performers & songs featured in Michael Bublé's Christmas in the City
Song(s)
"Blue Christmas"
"A Holly Jolly Christmas"
"Christmas (Baby Please Come Home)" featuring Hannah Waddingham
"I'll Be Home for Christmas" featuring Camila Cabello
"Jingle Bells" featuring Kermit the Frog
"The Christmas Song" featuring Leon Bridges
"White Christmas"
"It's Beginning to Look a Lot Like Christmas"
"Silent Night"

== Appearances ==
- Jimmy Fallon
- Leon Bridges

== Broadcast ==
to be added
