= Pop Negro =

2010 studio album by el Guincho

Studio album by El Guincho
- Released: 13 September 2010
- Genres: Tropicália; psychedelic pop
- Length: 33:58
- Language: Spanish
- Label: Young Turks
- Producers: Alejandro Mazzoni; Pablo Díaz-Reixa

El Guincho chronology
| Piratas de Sudamérica, Vol. 1 (2010) | Pop Negro (2010) | Hiperasia (2016) |

Pop Negro is the third studio album by El Guincho. It was released on 13 September 2010 by Young Turks. Pop Negro was named best Spanish album of 2010 by Rockdelux, while the single "Bombay" and its music video, directed by Nicolás Méndez, were named best song and best music video. The music video for "Bombay" also serves as part of the trailer for a larger film by Méndez, with music by El Guincho. Bombay is also on the soundtrack for the 2011 video game FIFA 12.

== Critical reception ==
Professional ratings
Aggregate scores
| Source | Rating |
|---|---|
| AnyDecentMusic? | 7.2/10 |
| Metacritic | 74/100 |
Review scores
| Source | Rating |
| AllMusic | 3.5/5 stars |
| Drowned in Sound | 7/10 |
| MusicOMH | 3/5 stars |
| NME | 4/5 stars |
| No Ripcord | 8/10 |
| Pitchfork | 6.1/10 |
| PopMatters | 8/10 |
| Sputnikmusic | 2.5/5 |

At Metacritic, which assigns a normalized rating out of 100 to reviews from mainstream critics, the album has an average score of 74 based on 13 reviews, indicating "generally favorable reviews". Laura Snapes of NME described the style of the album as "all the tropicalia and beach-lusting melodies of Animal Collective, Panda Bear and Fool's Gold put together."

== Track listing ==
| No. | Title | Writer(s) | Length |
|---|---|---|---|
| 1. | "Bombay" | | 3:39 |
| 2. | "Novias" | | 3:23 |
| 3. | "Ghetto Fácil" | | 2:44 |
| 4. | "Soca Del Eclipse" | | 4:10 |
| 5. | "Lycra Mistral" | | 3:49 |
| 6. | "Fm Tan Sexy" | | 3:41 |
| 7. | "Muerte Midi" | Santiago Auseron | 3:46 |
| 8. | "(Chica-Oh) Drims" | | 3:39 |
| 9. | "Danza Invinto" | | 5:07 |
| Total length: | | | 33:58 |
