= Alegranza (album) =

2007 studio album by el Guincho

Studio album by El Guincho
- Released: 2007
- Recorded: August–October 2007
- Genre: Tropicália; psychedelic pop; sampledelia
- Length: 40:01
- Label: Discoteca Océano

El Guincho chronology
Folías (2007)	Alegranza (2007)	Piratas de Sudamérica, Vol. 1 (2010)

Alegranza (sometimes spelled Alegranza!) is the second studio album by Spanish musician El Guincho. Originally released in 2007 by Discoteca Océano, it was re-released in March 2008 by Young Turks.

== Critical reception ==
Professional ratings
Aggregate scores
Source	Rating
Metacritic	79/100
Review scores
Source	Rating
AllMusic	4/5 stars
Blender	4/5 stars
Consequence of Sound	4.5/5 stars
The Guardian	3/5 stars
The Irish Times	4/5 stars
MSN Music (Consumer Guide)	A−
The Observer	4/5 stars
Pitchfork	8.3/10
Q	3/5 stars
Spin	4/5 stars

Club Fonograma named Alegranza its 2008 Album of the Year and the ninth best album of the decade. The album's opening track "Palmitos Park" was also named its 2008 Single of the Year.

== Track listing ==
All tracks are written by Pablo Díaz-Reixa, unless otherwise noted.

Alegranza track listing
No.	Title	Writer(s)	Length
1.	"Palmitos Park"	José Robles Díaz; Pablo Díaz-Reixa; Tony Pabón; Manny Rodríguez	2:28
2.	"Antillas"	Kipchamba Arap Tapotuk; Orianga Arap Chepkwony; Díaz-Reixa; Super Mazembe	5:29
3.	"Fata Morgana"	Frank Farian; Juan Esquivel García; Díaz-Reixa	3:34
4.	"Kalise"		5:08
5.	"Cuando Maravilla Fui"		3:34
6.	"Buenos Matrimonios Ahí Fuera"		6:46
7.	"Costa Paraíso"	Delia Derbyshire; Oscar B. Sulley; Díaz-Reixa	5:44
8.	"Prez Lagarto"	J. Baird; Díaz-Reixa	3:37
9.	"Polca Mazurca"		3:37
Total length:			40:01
