= He Knows =

2024 single by Camila Cabello featuring Lil Nas X

Single by Camila Cabello featuring Lil Nas X

from the album C,XOXO
- Released: May 10, 2024
- Length: 3:02
- Label: Geffen; Interscope
- Songwriters: Camila Cabello; Montero Hill; Daniel Aged; Jasper Harris; Ojerime Smith; Pablo Díaz
- Producers: El Guincho; Jasper Harris; Daniel Aged

Camila Cabello singles chronology
| "I Luv It" (2024) | "He Knows" (2024) | "Hot Uptown" (2024) |

Lil Nas X singles chronology
| "Where Do We Go Now?" (2024) | "He Knows" (2024) | "Here We Go!" (2024) |

Music video
- "He Knows" on YouTube

"He Knows" (stylized in all caps) is a song by American singer Camila Cabello featuring fellow American singer and rapper Lil Nas X. It was released through Geffen and Interscope Records on May 10, 2024, as the second single from the former's fourth studio album C,XOXO.

== Background ==
On May 8, Cabello announced the collaboration with the rapper, and revealed the artwork on her Instagram which was a close up picture of Lil Nas X with acrylic nails and sparkling jewels embracing Cabello that was seemingly taken at the Met Gala they attended two days prior. The visualizer for the song was released on the release date of the song, and the music video was released on May 22, 2024.

== Writing and composition ==
The song contains a sample of "Give It Up 2 Me" by Ojerime.

"Initially, when Jasper and Pablo Diaz-Reixa and I were in a studio session in Miami, I was like, "I've never made something that felt housey and electronic before." So they pulled up this Ojerime sample and I wrote, "He Knows." When we were talking about who could be a fire feature on it, we immediately thought of Nas. He's close friends with Jasper. We immediately were like, "We have to get Nas on this song because that would be the most iconic video."

— Cabello on how the song and collaboration came about, Rolling Stone

Forbes described it as another more mature and NSFW lyrical shift from Cabello's Fifth Harmony days. Nylon described it as a "house-leaning bop" that continues the "unfiltered messy pop girl vibe" she established with her previous single "I Luv It".

== Music video ==
The video was directed by Onda and it features Lil Nas X in the video. The video is stated to be a "dancefloor battle between friends vying for the attention of a mutual love interest."

== Critical reception ==
Zachary Horvath of HotNewHipHop described it as improvement of her last single "I Luv It" and praised Lil Nas X's verse as being more fun and animated than Playboi Carti's verse on "I Luv It".

== Credits and personnel ==
- Camila Cabello – vocals, writing
- Lil Nas X – vocals, writing
- Dale Becker – mastering
- Jon Castelli – mixing
- Pablo Díaz-Reixa – production, writing, programming, sampler
- Jasper Harris – production, writing, bass, synthesizer
- Daniel Aged - production, writing
- Brad Lauchert – mix engineering
- Bart Schoudel – engineering, vocal production

== Charts ==
Chart performance for "He Knows"
| Chart (2024) | Peak position |
|---|---|
| Canada CHR/Top 40 (Billboard) | 33 |
| Japan Hot Overseas (Billboard Japan) | 12 |
| New Zealand Hot Singles (RMNZ) | 19 |
| UK Singles Sales (OCC) | 63 |
| US Pop Airplay (Billboard) | 27 |

== Certifications ==
Certifications for "He Knows"
| Region | Certification | Certified units/sales |
|---|---|---|
| Brazil (Pro-Música Brasil) | Gold | 20,000^{‡} |
^{‡} Sales+streaming figures based on certification alone.
