= Hiperasia =

2016 studio album by el Guincho

Studio album by El Guincho
- Released: 12 February 2016
- Studio: El Green; Q Studios; Bad Company; El Sótano de Dios; Paulonia
- Genre: R&B; latin
- Length: 41:33
- Language: Spanish
- Label: Everlasting; Canada
- Producer: Pablo Díaz-Reixa; Brian Hernández

El Guincho chronology
Pop Negro (2010)	Hiperasia (2016)

Hiperasia (sometimes spelled HiperAsia) is the fourth studio album by Spanish musician El Guincho. It was released on 12 February 2016 by Everlasting Records and Canada Editorial.

== Critical reception ==
Professional ratings
Aggregate scores
Source	Rating
AnyDecentMusic?	6.5/10
Metacritic	72/100
Review scores
Source	Rating
AllMusic	4/5 stars
Consequence	B
The Guardian	3/5 stars
The Irish Times	3/5 stars
Mondo Sonoro	7/10
No Ripcord	6/10
Pitchfork	6.8/10
Q	6/10
The Skinny	3/5 stars
Uncut	7/10

At Metacritic, which assigns a weighted rating out of 100 to reviews from mainstream critics, the album has an average score of 72 based on 9 reviews, indicating "generally favorable reviews".

== Background and description ==
El Guincho was inspired by 2 events: his visit to Hiper Asia (a chain of Chinese shops in his hometown of Madrid) and a collaboration with artist Björk on his album Biophilia. The album is sonically electronic and highly conceptual.

== Track listing ==
All tracks are written by Pablo Díaz-Reixa, except "Cómix", written by Díaz-Reixa and María Rodríguez.

Hiperasia track listing
No.	Title	Length
1.	"Rotu Seco"	3:44
2.	"Cómix" (with Mala Rodríguez)	3:54
3.	"Pizza"	2:57
4.	"Sega"	3:24
5.	"De Bugas"	4:00
6.	"Parte Virtual"	3:20
7.	"Stena Drillmax"	3:17
8.	"Abdi"	1:49
9.	"Muchos Boys"	2:52
10.	"Hiperasia"	3:21
11.	"Pelo Rapado"	3:05
12.	"Mis Hits"	3:27
13.	"Zona Wi-Fi"	2:23
Total length:		41:33

== Personnel ==
Credits adapted from Bandcamp.

- Pablo-Díaz Reixa – production; arrangement; mixing
- Brian Hernández – production; arrangement; mixing
- Mala Rodríguez – featured artist (track 2)
- Vlado Meller – mastering
- Adrià Cañameras – artwork
