= I Luv It (Camila Cabello song) =

2024 single by Camila Cabello featuring Playboi Carti

Single by Camila Cabello featuring Playboi Carti

from the album C,XOXO
- Released: March 27, 2024
- Recorded: December 2023
- Studio: A2F Studios (Miami); The Sanctuary (London)
- Genre: Hyperpop; avant-pop; electropop
- Length: 2:55
- Label: Geffen; Interscope
- Songwriters: Camila Cabello; Jordan Carter; Radric Davis; Shondrae Crawford; Beninu Abolemiau; Jasper Harris; Howard Kaylan; Mark Volman; Pablo Díaz
- Producers: El Guincho; Harris

Camila Cabello singles chronology
"Ku Lo Sa" (2022)	"I Luv It" (2024)	"He Knows" (2024)

Playboi Carti singles chronology
"Type Shit" (2024)	"I Luv It" (2024)	"All Red" (2024)

Music video
- "I Luv It" on YouTube

Alternative cover
- Alternative cover used in China, Indonesia, and the Middle East

"I Luv It" (stylized in all caps) is a song by American singer Camila Cabello featuring American rapper Playboi Carti. It was released through Geffen and Interscope Records on March 27, 2024, as the lead single from Cabello's fourth studio album C,XOXO. A hyperpop, avant-pop, and electropop song, "I Luv It" samples the chorus of Gucci Mane's 2009 song "Lemonade" into its own chorus.

Upon release, it polarized music critics, who commented on the artist's shift from conventional pop to alternative hyperpop. Some praised the song's hype production, while another considered the change in style a "failed experiment", appreciating its departure from overly serious pop music. The song topped end-of-year lists, while also being listed amongst the worst songs of the year by several outlets.

== Background and promotion ==
"Certain things in our human realm do make me feel like I’m in outer space, and the very rare few times where I’ve had incredible chemistry with someone is one of them... Part of that cocktail is also the emotional drama between you and that person, and the chaos and butterflies and nerves and passion. It’s unsustainable and not peaceful and exhausting, but also, I luv it."

— Cabello discussing the song in a press release for "I Luv It"

Cabello first started teasing the song on March 5, 2024, which widely received comparisons to British singer Charli XCX's song "I Got It" (2017). A clip posted to her social media features the singer with blonde hair repeating the chorus over an "electro instrumental", while hanging out of a moving car which fans compared to a scene from Hereditary (2018). XCX acknowledged the comparisons to "I Got It" by recreating Cabello's car video using her own song, which was perceived as a "mockery" or a "jab". Cabello, however, reposted the video and embraced the comparisons in an interview for Paper, expressing admiration for XCX and dismissing the feud allegations. On March 22, American singer Lana Del Rey promoted the song through her Instagram account.

Cabello announced the single and shared the artwork on March 25. On March 27, 2024, the music video directed by Nicolás Méndez, the founder of Canada, and produced by the company, premiered along with the song.

== Composition ==
"I Luv It" was described by writers for Rolling Stone and Stereogum as hyperpop and "hyperactive avant-pop", respectively. Official Charts Company called it "a glitchy and reverb-soaked electro-pop tune," comparing it with early Grimes music as well as the sound of Charli XCX's collaborations with electronic music collective PC Music and her mixtape Pop 2. The song prominently interpolates the chorus of Gucci Mane's 2009 song "Lemonade" into its own chorus.

== Music video ==
The Nicolás Méndez-directed music video contrasts a scene of Cabello eating from a whole chocolate cake with different nightmarish sequences of her, including sprinting away from dogs, getting beaten up in a wrestling match, being stuck at the top of a palm tree, and lying mangled on a car. Cabello is seen shooting up a king-sized bed with an imaginary automatic firearm. Playboi Carti appears alongside Cabello in a gas station convenience store, which is preceded by an exterior nighttime shot of Cabello dancing blindfold with a group of women. The video ends with Cabello waiting for medical treatment, having been shot through the heart by Cupid's arrow.

On December 18, 2024, the music video earned six nominations at the 8th Annual California Music Video Awards.

== Live performances ==
Cabello performed "I Luv It" live for the very first time, along with Lana Del Rey in the opening night of the second weekend at Coachella 2024, which is her debut performance at Coachella. Cabello performed it again on The Tonight Show Starring Jimmy Fallon on June 12.

== Critical reception ==
"I Luv It" polarized critics. Most remarked on her change in sound from conventional pop to alternative hyperpop. In a positive review, Robin Murray of Clash complimented the song's "colossal sense of acceleration" and "hyper-colorful production". In a mixed review, Alphonse Pierre of Pitchfork described Cabello's switch to hyperpop a "failed experiment", however noting that "while quite a few of the mega, mega pop stars are begging to be taken so seriously, it's nice to just hear some good ol' fashioned expensive nonsense." Steffanee Wang of Nylon further commented on the shift in Cabello's sound, stating her effort "feels so transparently calculated you can almost visualize all the decks, emails, and vision boards, but she also commits to it all so hard you have to give her credit".

Pitchfork ranked the song at number 35 on their 100 Best Songs of 2024 list, calling it "a reminder that there are more important things in life than 'authenticity'". On the other hand, Variety placed it on their Worst Songs of 2024 list, noting that Cabello's part was only one repeated phrase and Playboi Carti's incomprehensible rap, though they said the song's production "isn't bad" and the song is "hilarious" more than terrible.

=== Accolades ===
Year-end lists
Publication	List	Rank	Ref.
Pitchfork	The 100 Best Songs of 2024	35	
The New Yorker	The Best Pop Songs of 2024	1	
Variety	The Worst Songs of 2024	Placed	
The Washington Post	Best singles of 2024	1	

== Credits and personnel ==
- Camila Cabello – vocals
- Playboi Carti – vocals
- Dale Becker – mastering
- Jon Castelli – mixing
- Pablo Díaz-Reixa – production, bass, drum programming, sampler
- Marcus Fritz – mixing, engineering, vocal production
- Jasper Harris – production, bass, programming, synthesizer
- Brad Lauchert – mix engineering, engineering assistance
- Salvador Majail – engineering
- Bart Schoudel – engineering, vocal production

== Charts ==
Chart performance for "I Luv It"
Chart (2024)	Peak position
Austria (Ö3 Austria Top 40)	59
Canada Hot 100 (Billboard)	66
Global 200 (Billboard)	90
Greece International (IFPI)	74
Ireland (IRMA)	47
Japan Hot Overseas (Billboard Japan)	17
Netherlands (Tipparade)	21
New Zealand Hot Singles (RMNZ)	9
Nigeria (TurnTable Top 100)	60
Poland (Polish Streaming Top 100)	40
Portugal (AFP)	188
Slovakia Airplay (ČNS IFPI)	58
Slovakia Singles Digital (ČNS IFPI)	97
Sweden Heatseeker (Sverigetopplistan)	20
Switzerland (Schweizer Hitparade)	66
UK Singles (Official Charts)	61
US Billboard Hot 100	81

== Certifications ==
Certifications for "I Luv It"
Region	Certification	Certified units/sales
Brazil (Pro-Música Brasil)	Platinum	40,000^{‡}
Canada (Music Canada)	Platinum	80,000^{‡}
Poland (ZPAV)	Gold	25,000^{‡}
^{‡} Sales+streaming figures based on certification alone.

== Release history ==
Release dates and formats for "I Luv It"
Region	Date	Format	Label	Ref.
Various	March 27, 2024	Digital download; streaming	Geffen; Interscope	
Italy	April 4, 2024	Radio airplay	Universal	
