= C,XOXO =

2024 studio album by Camila Cabello

- Standard cover

Studio album by Camila Cabello
- Released: June 28, 2024
- Studios: A2F (Miami); The Sanctuary (London); Studio 26 (Miami); Interecope (Santa Monica); EastWest (Los Angeles); Westlake (Los Angeles); Henson (Los Angeles); Electric Lady (New York); QC (Atlanta); Palm Villa (Miami); The Chapel (Toronto); Criteria (Miami); The Duney Cave (Lancaster)
- Genre: Pop
- Length: 32:23
- Labels: Geffen; Interscope
- Producers: Boi-1da; Daniel Aged; FnZ; El Guincho; Jasper Harris; Kid Masterpiece; Aaron Shadrow; Yogi

Camila Cabello chronology
Familia (2022)	C,XOXO (2024)

Alternative cover
- Magic City Edition cover

Singles from C,XOXO
- 1. "I Luv It" Released: March 27, 2024; 2. "He Knows" Released: May 10, 2024; 3. "Hot Uptown" Released: June 28, 2024

Singles from C,XOXO (Magic City Edition)
- 1. "Godspeed" Released: September 4, 2024

C,XOXO is the fourth studio album by American singer Camila Cabello. It was released on June 28, 2024, through Geffen and Interscope Records, and is her first album following her departure from Epic Records. Primarily a pop record, C,XOXO incorporates hyperpop, dance, and hip-hop music. Guest vocalists include Playboi Carti, Lil Nas X, City Girls, BLP Kosher, Drake, and uncredited vocals from PinkPantheress, with the Magic City Edition including a collaboration with Eem Triplin.

C,XOXO was preceded by the singles "I Luv It" with Carti—which peaked at number 81 on the Billboard Hot 100—and "He Knows" with Lil Nas X, as well as a promotional single "Chanel No. 5". Following the album's release, "Hot Uptown" featuring Drake was released as the third single. "Godspeed" was released as the fourth and final single in September, alongside the Magic City Edition which features 4 additional tracks. The album was met with generally positive reviews from music critics, who praised its sonic experimentation though were ambivalent towards Cabello's new direction.

== Background and recording ==
Following the release of Cabello's third studio album, Familia, in 2022, it was announced that she had departed from Epic Records and signed to Universal Music Group's label Interscope Records in September. Around this time, Cabello expressed a desire for greater creative independence. She explained that she had become less reliant on others' opinions and emphasized that she would only release songs she could "stand behind" and wanted to perform.

Cabello recorded much of C,XOXO in Miami rather than her usual base of Los Angeles. She and her team also spent 10 days recording in the Bahamas, where Cabello recalled working in the studio almost constantly. According to the liner notes of C,XOXO, the album was recorded at multiple studios, including A2F, The Sanctuary, Studio 26, Interecope, EastWest, Westlake, Henson, Electric Lady, QC, Palm Villa, The Chapel, Criteria, and the Duney Cave.

== Development ==
Cabello depicted C,XOXO as a return to the songwriting-centered approach with which she began her career. In an interview with Alexandra Cooper for Call Her Daddy, she said the album involved "sitting in the discomfort of things" rather than seeking clear answers, and that its development began with her "getting back to that first passion of songwriting" through exploring musical, artistic, and literary references. She also discussed the album's sonic departure from her previous work in an interview with Apple Music's Zane Lowe, crediting producers El Guincho and Jasper Harris with helping her pursue a more unconventional sound. Cabello said that working with the two allowed them to create a space where they could "do what [they] think is fire" without worrying about conventional expectations.

According to Cabello, C,XOXO's more experimental direction marks a departure from her usual approach, which encouraged her to adopt a "what's the worst that can happen?" attitude. Cabello drew on the work ethic of her immigrant family, particularly her mother, which she said gave her the "hustle mentality" needed to make the album. Seeking greater independence in the writing process, Cabello adopted her experience of writing verses alone for previous collaborations, identifying "Chanel No. 5" as a turning point; according to her, the song "could only belong to this project" and its creation helped the rest of the album "fall into place".

Unlike Cabello's previous albums, which involved numerous co-writers and producers, C,XOXO was made primarily with producers El Guincho and Jasper Harris. Cabello said she favored producers who "pick the weird sounds" and "aren't just going for what sounds safe", describing them as "risk-takers". Her collaboration with Drake began with a direct message, which Cabello initially sent as part of an effort to reconnect with other artists after describing herself as having been "a hermit" for an extended period. Drake liked the project, and the feature "came out of a nontransactional place", according to her. He had already developed an idea for a song called "Hot Uptown", which Cabello felt captured the atmosphere of Miami.

== Composition ==
C,XOXO is a pop record with elements of hyperpop, hip-hop, avant-pop, alt-pop, Afrobeats, R&B, reggaetón, and electronic music. The album draws heavily on hip-hop, incorporating interludes and features from artists including Playboi Carti, Drake, and City Girls members JT and Yung Miami. Its production is built primarily around synthesizers, samples, and aggressive drums, with minimal use of layered instrumentation and no guitars. According to her, Cabello and her collaborators initially experimented with different genres while searching for the album's sonic direction, with "Chanel No. 5" ultimately "crack[ing] open the album".

Cabello described the voice she found on C,XOXO as having a "big baddie energy vibe", which she associated with taking risks and "doing whatever you want". She explained that her blonde hair was part of this transformation, which served as a visual way to signal "a new era" and introduce "a new character". Cabello also associated C,XOXO with a distinct visual palette; she depicted its essence as "velvety blue, pink, purple, lavender" and said that the album felt "like what it is to be a Pisces".

=== Influences ===
Miami was a major source of inspiration for C,XOXO. Describing it as "a love letter to Miami" and "a Miami art piece", Cabello cited the city as both a personal anchor rooted in her family and childhood and a major influence on the album's sound and atmosphere. She said Miami had also shaped her musical taste, depicting the city as a "melting pot" of sounds including Afrobeat, rap, and salsa. Spending more time in there also deepened her connection to it, as she said she had "fall[en] in love with [her] Miami even more" and described it as "such a big part of who [she was] as a person and as an artist". Guincho stated that Cabello's voice as a writer "felt very much like the city itself", viewing the album as an opportunity to represent Miami within a pop context.

C,XOXO drew on the 2000s hip-hop Cabello encountered after moving from Havana to the United States, as well as the creative philosophy of Rainer Maria Rilke's Letters to a Young Poet whose idea of "living your questions" encouraged Cabello to move forward without waiting to have everything figured out. Harris stated the album was deeply influenced by rap, describing how the team experimented with rap cadences and their swagger alongside contrasting musical elements such as lush guitar and melodic arrangements: "If it's a sweet melody, let's make the music scary. [...] If she has a rap flow, let's make the music acoustic."

Cabello cited T-Pain as an inspiration for her more pronounced vocal manipulation on C,XOXO. The record also references Miami rapper Pitbull, whose music was ubiquitous in the city before his international breakthrough. Coming from a Latin household where Cabello primarily heard Latin music, Michael Jackson, and popular 1980s hits, she studied classic hip-hop and rock albums she had not previously heard, including Nas's Illmatic and Pink Floyd's The Wall. Cabello explained: "I think it's important to always be studying what genres kind of influenced the genres that are informing the genres now."

=== Lyrics and themes ===
C,XOXO explores Cabello's coming-of-age and romantic experiences following her relationship with Shawn Mendes. She described the album as an exploration of "girlhood into womanhood", saying that "Dream Girls" reflected her own experience of "learning to be a woman". "Twentysomethings" reflects on a relationship that was not working, and it drew inspiration from SZA's reflections on her own twenties. "June Gloom" explores lingering feelings after an encounter with a former partner, using the foggy weather phenomenon of the same name as a metaphor for heartbreak. Its lyrics—which Harris described as "vulnerable and brave"—portray Cabello's jealousy and unresolved feelings, including her admission that the former partner was "all I think about".

=== Songs ===
C,XOXO opens with "I Luv It", featuring American rapper Playboi Carti. Sampling Gucci Mane's "Lemonade", the hyperpop track combines a hip-hop beat. "I Luv It" was heavily contrasted with Charli XCX's 2017 song "I Got It", which first Cabello felt nagative but later accepted. Its unpredictability represented a deliberate departure from Cabello's previous work; she described its sound as a "kick-the-door-down moment" and added that she would rather make a song new to her than repeat what she had done before. "Chanel No. 5" features R&B-inspired vocals and minimalist production. Cabello identified the song's coy, cheeky, and "kind of devious" tone as the voice she wanted to establish throughout C,XOXO.

"Pink XOXO" is a short interlude that features PinkPantheress's vocals. An electropop song "He Knows" with Lil Nas X combines disco-house and hip-hop with dance influences, sampling Ojerime's "Give It Up 2 Me". "Twentysomethings" is an acoustic track. Piano is featured prominently on a hip-hop anthem "Dade Country Dreaming" which features JT and Yung Miami.

"Hot Uptown", featuring Drake, contains dancehall beat. The next track "Uuugly" only features him, with only Cabello shortly singing. "Dream-Girls" samples the-Dream's "Shawty Is Da Shit" (2007); it is an R&B song with the elements of reggaeton and Latin pop. "B.O.A.T." is an emo track, sampling Pitbull's 2009 single "Hotel Room Service". A pop song with dance elements "Pretty When I Cry" pairs a late-night, melancholic mood with a warped sample of "Hotel Room Service", and further contrasts with Cabello's earlier bubblegum sound. The closing track, "June Gloom", is a synth-driven ballad.

== Release and promotion ==
"I Luv It", with Playboi Carti, was released as the lead single on March 27, 2024. The song debuted and peaked at number 81 on the US Billboard Hot 100. "He Knows", with Lil Nas X, was released as the second single on May 10, while "Chanel No. 5" was released as the album's first promotional single on June 21. "Hot Uptown", featuring Canadian rapper Drake, impacted US contemporary hit radio as the third single on June 28.

On August 29, Cabello announced the Magic City deluxe edition of the album, releasing on September 6, alongside the first single "Godspeed" and its music video also being released on the same day.

=== Live performances ===
On April 19, 2024, Cabello appeared as a surprise performer during Lana Del Rey's set at Coachella; she performed "I Luv It" with the singer. She then appeared as a speaker at the guest panel of American Express and F1 Academy's event, "A Celebration of Women with Drive", on May 1—where she performed an acoustic version of "I Luv It" and the then-unreleased album track "Twentysomethings". Cabello performed "I Luv It" again on the June 12, 2024 episode of The Tonight Show Starring Jimmy Fallon.

To promote C,XOXO, Cabello performed at multiple festivals; she revealed that the vision for her performances was "[this] magical world that [Cabello] and the XOXO girls and guys can all live in for a while". She debuted music from the album at the Rock in Rio Lisboa and Mawazine festivals on June 23 and 25, in Lisbon and Rabat. Following the album's release, she performed at Tinderbox in Odense, on the Other Stage at Glastonbury, at Hera HSBC in Mexico City, and the iHeartRadio Music Festival in Las Vegas, between June and September 2024. Cabello's festival performances' production consisted of "dancers [in] Cyberdog-esque outfits", "robotic camera dog[s]", "BMX riders [on] skate ramps", "[melting] ice [pops]", and "a stage filled with popular playground games". DIY described her Rock in Rio Lisboa set as "a high-budget production" wherein Cabello "[was] determined to commit to the bit, and [did] so with aplomb", while NME stated that "there [was] occasionally method in the madness" of her Glastonbury set. Morocco World News praised Cabello's "communion with her audience".

The Rock in Rio Lisboa concert was recorded and subsequently released on September 5, 2024, as an Apple Music Live exclusive with both a film of the concert and a live album, on Apple Music and Apple TV+. On September 11, Cabello performed "Godspeed", the lead single of the album's Magic City Edition, at the 2024 MTV Video Music Awards; a recording of her singing the opening of album track "June Gloom" was used as a precursor. By the end of September, she performed stripped renditions of "Godspeed", "June Gloom" and Addison Rae's "Diet Pepsi" on the Live Lounge. A series of official Vevo live performances of several songs from the album, filmed "indoors for a 90s, bubble-gum pink vibe", was released throughout October. Cabello performed on December 21 at the Miami show of iHeartRadio's 2024 Jingle Ball Tour.

Cabello embarked on her second headlining concert tour, the Yours, C Tour, in June 2025 to promote the album.

== Critical reception ==
Professional ratings
Aggregate scores
Source	Rating
AnyDecentMusic?	5.5/10
Metacritic	64/100
Review scores
Source	Rating
AllMusic	3.5/5 stars
Clash	7/10
Exclaim!	6/10
The Guardian	2/5 stars
NME	3/5 stars
Paste	2.5/10
Pitchfork	6.9/10
Rolling Stone	3.5/5 stars
Slant Magazine	2/5 stars
Sputnikmusic	4/5

According to the review aggregator Metacritic, C,XOXO received "generally favorable reviews" based on a weighted average score of 64 out of 100 from 12 critic scores.

Commentary on C,XOXO largely focused on Cabello's shift in sound. Writing for The Guardian, Alexis Petridis opined that the album's direction compared to Cabello's earlier discography was "pretty radical to the point of being occasionally baffling". He concluded that Cabello "often sounds slightly uncomfortable" and that she "feels like a guest on her own album" due to the prominence of its featured artists. In Rolling Stone, Maura Johnston noted that Cabello embraces a "weirdo" persona, describing the album as an experimental departure from her previous work. NME reviewer Nick Levine highlighted the album's "party girl rebrand" and described its songs as "scrappy, intriguing earworms".

Harry Tafoya of Pitchfork noted its mix of genres and its sonic variety, while Slant Magazine reviewer Paul Attard criticized the album for "mistaking mimicry for mastery". However, James Mellen from Clash appreciated its boldness and the departure from Cabello's earlier pop sound, and Sputnikmusic's Sowing praised its innovation and execution. Ben Devlin of MusicOMH described C,XOXO as an "absolute whirlwind of ideas" and felt that its disparate musical elements were not always coherent, but he called them "fascinating nonetheless". Devlin singled out "I Luv It" and "Pretty When I Cry" for their production and vocal performances, although he ultimately felt that the album had failed to revive Cabello's popularity.

Writing for The A.V. Club, Drew Gillis argued that the album's supposed reinvention was largely aesthetic, describing it as rooted in pop-trap, pop-reggaeton, and pop ballads. He also viewed Cabello's attempts at a more personal and unconventional image as revealing a "desperation" to gain approval. Paste's Leah Weinstein was more critical, arguing that Cabello showed "no artistic vision or direction" and criticizing the album's generic lyrics, conspicuous Auto-Tune, and inconsistent production. She also compared its marketing and aesthetics unfavorably with Charli XCX's 2024 album Brat.

=== Year-end lists ===
Select year-end rankings for C,XOXO
Publication	Accolade	Rank	Ref.
Rolling Stone	The 100 Best Albums of 2024	85	
Complex	The 50 Best Albums of 2024	44	
The Line of Best Fit	The 50 Best Albums of the Year	14	
Paper	The Best Albums of 2024	–	

=== Retrospective reception ===
In an August 2026 retrospective for The Fader, Tobias Hess said that C,XOXO had gained renewed appreciation two years after its release, noting that it had remained "in the pop conversation". He praised its "raw and fresh" qualities and suggested that its once-controversial eclecticism had become more accepted in 2020s pop. He also suggested that C,XOXO failed to make a great impact initially "because it came out during the oxygen-suck that was Brat and featured not one, but two Drake features during the peak of his ill-fated beef with Kendrick Lamar", adding that "it just felt like the universe was prohibiting the record from breaking through." Later the same month, Celia Almeida of the Miami New Times wrote: "C,XOXO truthers, your moment has arrived. If you supported Camila Cabello's last album cycle all along — haters be damned — you've earned the right to be smug."

== Commercial performance ==
In the United States, C,XOXO debuted at number thirteen on the Billboard 200 earning 36,500 album-equivalent units, becoming her first album to miss the top 10. It reached the top 10 in Portugal and Spain.

In August 2026, renewed interest in C,XOXO following Hess's essay advocating for the album's "second chance" led to a substantial increase in its searches and streaming figures. According to Spotify, the album's global streams increased by 475% on August 9 compared with its June–July 2026 average, while "B.O.A.T." saw a 70% increase in US streams on August 11. Spotify subsequently added "B.O.A.T." to its "Lorem" playlist at number two.

== Track listing ==
Standard edition
No.	Title	Writer(s)	Producer	Length
1.	"I Luv It" (with Playboi Carti)	Camila Cabello; Jordan Carter; Pablo Díaz-Reixa; Jasper Harris; Howard Kaylan; Mark Volman; Tarik Adolemiui; Radric Davis; Shondrae Crawford	El Guincho; Harris; Bart Schoudel^{[v]}; Marcus Fritz^{[v]}	2:54
2.	"Chanel No. 5"	Cabello; Dashawn Moore; Nayvadius Wilburn; Joshua Luellen; Díaz-Reixa; Harris	El Guincho; Harris; Schoudel^{[v]}	2:40
3.	"Pink XOXO"	Cabello; Victoria Walker; Díaz-Reixa; Harris	El Guincho; Harris; Schoudel^{[v]}	0:55
4.	"He Knows" (with Lil Nas X)	Cabello; Montero Hill; Ojerime Smith; Díaz-Reixa; Daniel Aged; Harris	Aged; El Guincho; Harris; Schoudel^{[v]}	3:01
5.	"Twentysomethings"	Cabello; Aaron Shadrow; Díaz-Reixa; Harris	Shadrow; El Guincho; Harris; Schoudel^{[v]}	2:42
6.	"Dade County Dreaming" (featuring JT & Yung Miami)	Cabello; Jatavia Johnson; Caresha Brownlee; Lasana Smith; Nicholaus Williams; Salvador Majail; Díaz-Reixa; Harris	El Guincho; Harris; Schoudel^{[v]}	2:39
7.	"Koshi XOXO" (featuring BLP Kosher)	Cabello; Benjamin Pavlon; Díaz-Reixa; Harris; Yanaco	El Guincho; Harris; Schoudel^{[v]}	0:46
8.	"Hot Uptown" (featuring Drake)	Cabello; Aubrey Graham; Matthew Samuels; Mingiedi Mawangu; Johann Deterville; Harris; Díaz-Reixa	Boi-1da; El Guincho; Yogi; Harris; Noel Cadastre^{[v]}	2:30
9.	"Uuugly" (performed by Drake)	Graham; Kaushik Barua; Harris; Díaz-Reixa	Kid Masterpiece; Harris; El Guincho	1:55
10.	"Dream-Girls"	Cabello; Terius Gesteelde-Diamant; Carlos McKinney; Hidde Ament; Gesteelde-Diamant; Díaz-Reixa; Harris	Hidde; Harris; El Guincho; Schoudel^{[v]}	2:51
11.	"305tilidie"	Cabello; Díaz-Reixa; Harris	El Guincho; Harris	0:49
12.	"B.O.A.T."	Cabello; Daniel McKay; Raymond Davies; Ross Campbell; Armando Pérez; Graham Wilson; Hugh Brankin; John Reid; Nile Rodgers; Bernard Edwards; Díaz-Reixa; Harris	Aged; El Guincho; Harris	2:56
13.	"Pretty When I Cry"	Cabello; Shadrow; Shadrow; Díaz-Reixa; Harris	Shadrow; El Guincho; Harris; Schoudel^{[v]}	2:34
14.	"June Gloom"	Cabello; Díaz-Reixa; Harris; Michael Mulé; Isaac de Boni; Díaz-Reixa; Harris	FnZ; El Guincho; Harris; Schoudel^{[v]}	3:00
Total length:				32:23

June Gloom version
No.	Title	Lyrics	Music	Length
15.	"June Gloom" (Acapella)	Cabello; Díaz-Reixa; Harris	Mulé; Boni; Díaz-Reixa; Harris	3:00
Total length:				35:23

Chanel No. 5 version
No.	Title	Lyrics	Music	Length
15.	"Chanel No. 5" (Acapella)	Cabello; Moore	Wilburn; Luellen; Díaz-Reixa; Harris	2:40
Total length:				35:03

Magic City Edition
No.	Title	Writer(s)	Producer	Length
15.	"Baby Pink" (with Eem Triplin)	Cabello; Muhammad Akbar; Daoud Anthony; Daniel McKay; Díaz-Reixa; Harris	Aged; El Guincho; Harris; Triplin; Schoudel^{[v]}	3:52
16.	"Come Show Me"	Cabello; Tobias Jesso Jr.; Morris Anthony Harper; Díaz-Reixa; Harris	El Guincho; Harris; Schoudel^{[v]}	2:21
17.	"Can Friends Kiss?"	Cabello; Damini Ebunoluwa Ogulu; Austin Iwar; Ludwig Göransson; Peace Oredope; Díaz-Reixa; Harris	El Guincho; Harris; Schoudel^{[v]}	2:17
18.	"Godspeed"	Cabello; Raul Cubina; Mark Williams; Zack Sekoff; Díaz-Reixa; Harris	El Guincho; Harris; Schoudel^{[v]}	3:36
Total length:				44:29

Magic City Edition Apple Music video edition
No.	Title	Length
19.	"I Luv It" (with Playboi Carti; music video)	3:22
20.	"He Knows" (with Lil Nas X; music video)	4:06
21.	"Chanel No. 5" (music video)	2:39
Total length:		54:36

=== Notes ===
- ^{^[v]} signifies a vocal producer.
- "I Luv It" contains a sample of "Lemonade" (2009), written by Radric Davis and Shondrae Crawford, as performed by Gucci Mane; which itself contains samples and interpolations from "Keep It Warm" (1976), written by Mark Volman and Howard Kaylan, as performed by Flo & Eddie.
- "Chanel No.5" contains a sample of "Married to the Game" (2016), written by Dashawn Moore, Nayvadius Wilburn and Joshua Luellen, as performed by DJ Esco and Future, and produced by Southside.
- "Pink XOXO" contains uncredited vocals from PinkPantheress.
- "Pink XOXO" and "He Knows" contain a sample of "Give It Up 2 Me" (2020), written by Ojerime Smith, as performed by Ojerime.
- On physical releases, "Dade County Dreaming" is listed as featuring City Girls, due to being manufactured before the duo disbanded.
- "Dream-Girls" contains a sample of "Shawty Is da Shit" (2007), written by Terius Gesteelde-Diamant and Carlos McKinney, as performed by The-Dream featuring Fabolous.
- "B.O.A.T." contains a sample of "Hotel Room Service" (2009), written by Armando Pérez and James Scheffer, as performed by Pitbull—which itself contains an interpolation of "Rapper's Delight" (1979), written by Nile Rodgers and Bernard Edwards, as performed by the Sugarhill Gang; an interpolation of "One and One" (1987), written by Luther Campbell, David Hobbs, Mark Ross and Christopher Wong Won, as performed by 2 Live Crew; and a sample of "Push the Feeling On" (1992), written by Ross Campbell, John Reid, Hugh Brankin, Graham Wilson and Mark Kinchen, performed by Nightcrawlers.
- "Can Friends Kiss?" contains a sample of "Alone" (2022), written by Damini Ebunoluwa Ogulu, Austin Iwar, Ludwig Göransson and Peace Oredope, as performed by Burna Boy.

== Personnel ==
The credits were adapted from Tidal.

=== Musicians ===
- Camila Cabello – vocals (tracks 1–6, 8–10, 12–18)
- Pablo Díaz-Reixa – programming (tracks 1–4, 6–8, 10, 12–15, 17), sampler (1, 2, 4, 7, 8, 10, 12, 14), bass (1, 6, 8, 10, 13, 15–16), drum programming (1), drums (2, 4–6, 8, 10, 12, 14–18), synthesizer (3, 5, 8, 13, 15–16), sequencer (13), 5-string banjo (14), guitar (16)
- Jasper Harris – synthesizer (tracks 1, 3–6, 8, 10, 12–18), bass (1, 4, 14, 16–17), programming (1), piano (2, 5, 10)
- Playboi Carti – vocals (track 1)
- PinkPantheress – vocals (track 3)
- Daniel McKay – synthesizer (track 4), guitar (12, 15), bass (15)
- Lil Nas X – vocals (track 4)
- Aaron Shadow – guitar (tracks 5, 13), percussion (13)
- Owen Pallett – strings (tracks 6, 11)
- JT – vocals (track 6)
- Yung Miami – vocals (track 6)
- BLP Kosher – vocals (track 7)
- Drake – vocals (tracks 8, 9)
- Hidde Ament – vocals, keyboards (track 10)
- Eem Triplin – vocals (track 15)
- Mark Williams – synthesizer (track 18)
- Raul Cubina – synthesizer (track 18)

=== Technical ===
- Dale Becker – mastering
- Jon Castelli – mixing
- Marcus Fritz – mixing, engineering (track 1)
- Salvador "Better Call Sal" Majail – engineering (tracks 1–8, 12, 14–16)
- Bart Schoudel – engineering (tracks 1–6, 10, 12–18)
- Drew Sliger – engineering (track 4)
- Noel Cadastre – engineering (track 8)
- Pablo Díaz-Reixa – engineering (track 11)
- Brad Lauchert – mix engineering (tracks 1, 2, 4–6, 8), mixing assistance (3, 7), engineering assistance (1)
- Katie Harvey – mastering assistance (tracks 2–4, 8, 15–18)
- Noah McCorkle – mastering assistance (tracks 2–4, 8, 15–18)
- Pedro Kayat – engineering assistance (tracks 2, 12–15)
- Antonio "DJ Fuse" Olivera – engineering assistance (track 2, 18)
- Muhammad Akbar – engineering assistance (track 15)
- Andrew "Robby" Anderson – engineering assistance (track 15)

== Charts ==
Chart performance
Chart (2024)	Peak position
Australian Albums (ARIA)	29
Austrian Albums (Ö3 Austria)	16
Belgian Albums (Ultratop Flanders)	13
Belgian Albums (Ultratop Wallonia)	24
Canadian Albums (Billboard)	20
Dutch Albums (Album Top 100)	15
French Albums (SNEP)	54
German Albums (Offizielle Top 100)	20
Irish Albums (IRMA)	57
Italian Albums (FIMI)	61
Japanese Digital Albums (Oricon)	43
Japanese Hot Albums (Billboard Japan)	84
New Zealand Albums (RMNZ)	25
Norwegian Albums (VG-lista)	37
Polish Albums (ZPAV)	39
Portuguese Albums (AFP)	5
Scottish Albums (Official Charts)	16
Spanish Albums (Promusicae)	10
Swiss Albums (Schweizer Hitparade)	15
UK Albums (Official Charts)	20
US Billboard 200	13
