= Camila Cabello =

Cuban-Mexican-American singer-songwriter (born 1997)

- Cabello at the 2026 Latin Grammy Awards
- Born: Karla Camila Cabello Estrabao; March 3, 1997 (age 29); Cojímar, Habana del Este, Cuba
- Citizenship: Cuba; Mexico; United States (since 2008)
- Occupation: Singer-songwriter
- Years active: 2012–present
- Works: Discography (Note: For her works with Fifth Harmony, see Fifth Harmony discography and List of songs recorded by Fifth Harmony)
- Awards: Full list
- Musical career
- Origin: Miami, Florida, U.S.
- Genres: Pop; R&B
- Instruments: Vocals; guitar
- Labels: Epic; Syco; Interscope; Geffen
- Formerly of: Fifth Harmony
- Website: camilacabello.com

Karla Camila Cabello Estrabao (/kəˈmiːlə kəˈbeɪoʊ/; Latin American Spanish: [ˈkaɾla kaˈmila kaˈβeʝo esˈtɾaβao]; born March 3, 1997) is a Cuban-Mexican-American singer-songwriter. She rose to prominence as a member of the girl group, Fifth Harmony, one of the best-selling girl groups of all time (16th). While in the group, Cabello established herself as a solo artist with collaborative singles "I Know What You Did Last Summer" (with Shawn Mendes) and "Bad Things" (with Machine Gun Kelly), the latter making number four on the US Billboard Hot 100. She left Fifth Harmony in late 2016.

Cabello's debut studio album, Camila (2018), peaked atop the US Billboard 200. Largely influenced by Latin music, its lead single "Havana" (featuring Young Thug) was an international chart-topper. It was the best-selling digital single of 2018, according to the International Federation of the Phonographic Industry (IFPI). Its follow-up, "Never Be the Same" reached the top ten in multiple countries. Cabello's 2019 second studio album, Romance, peaked at number three on the Billboard 200 and spawned a second global chart-topper in "Señorita", a duet with Mendes. Cabello's third album, Familia (2022), made number ten on the Billboard 200 and contained the international hit "Bam Bam" (featuring Ed Sheeran). Cabello's fourth studio album, C,XOXO, was released in 2024, and it peaked at number 13 on the Billboard 200.

Cabello's awards include two Latin Grammy Awards, five American Music Awards, and one Billboard Music Award. In 2021, Cabello starred as the title character in the film Cinderella.

== Early life and education ==
Karla Camila Cabello Estrabao was born on March 3, 1997, in Cojímar, within the Habana del Este district of Havana, Cuba, to Alejandro Cabello and Sinuhe Estrabao. Her father was born in Mexico City, Mexico, and her mother is Cuban. After meeting in Mexico City, her parents moved to Cuba. She has a younger sister named Sofia. Her paternal great-great-grandfather was Próculo Capistrán, a revolutionary who fought in the Mexican Revolution alongside Emiliano Zapata.

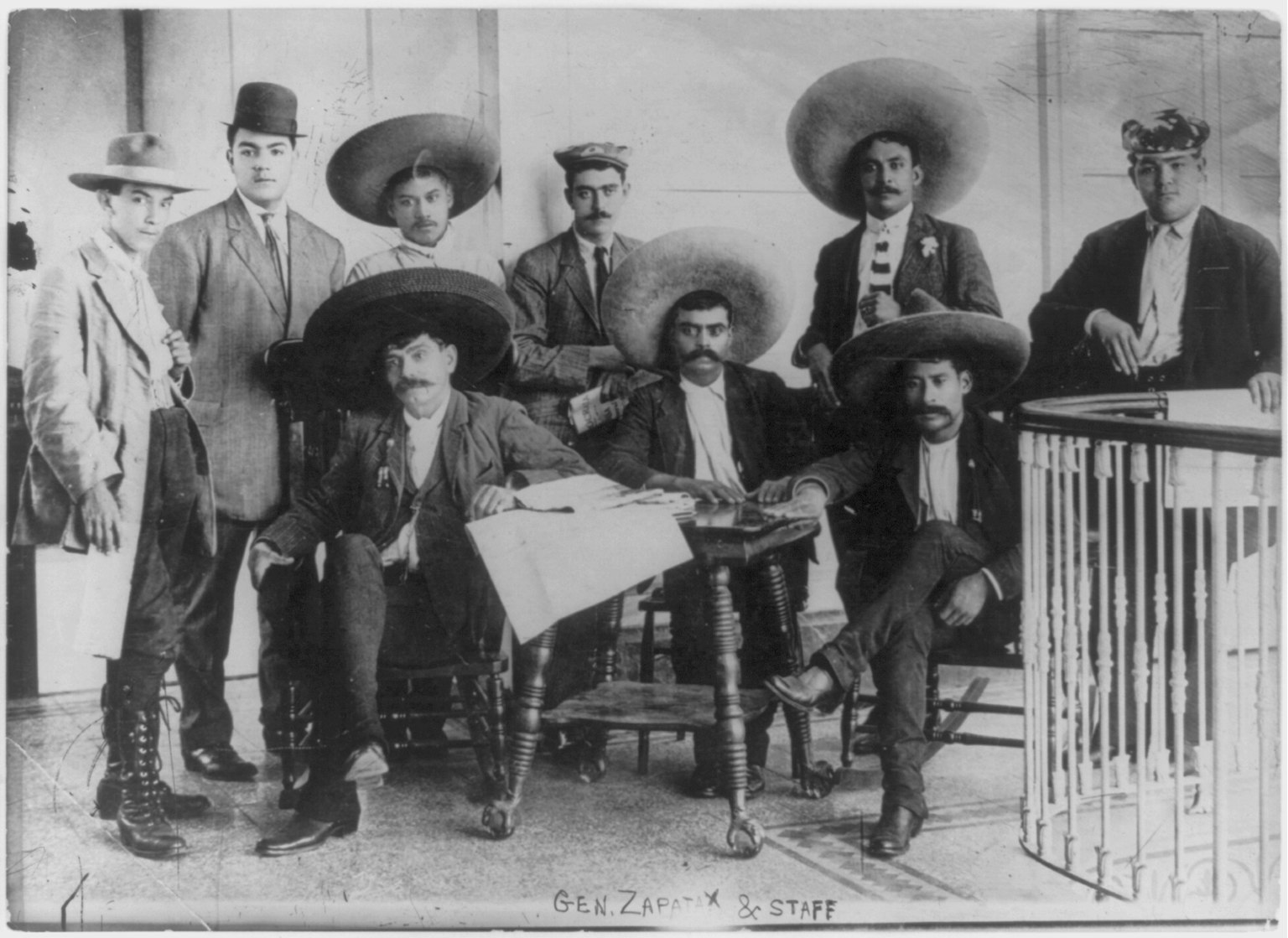
Cabello's great-great-grandfather Próculo Capistrán (seated right) pictured next to Emiliano Zapata (center), Eufemio Zapata (left) and other revolutionaries photographed around 1911

She spent much of her early life moving back and forth between Mexico and Cuba. She identifies as "Cuban-Mexican".

Mexico, this is where my mom and dad met, so without this city, I wouldn't exist... Tonight I'm at home... Many talk a lot about my Cuban side, but don't forget that I'm also very, very Mexican.

— Cabello at the HSBC Hera Festival 2024, in Mexico City.

When Cabello was between 6 and 7, she relocated to Miami, Florida with her mother, crossing the border from Mexico to the United States and taking a 36-hour Greyhound bus ride to Miami, after waiting only one day at the border before being granted permission to enter the US. Cabello was told by her mother that she was going to Walt Disney World as an incentive to go to the US; they moved into the home of Cabello's grandfather's colleague, who would later become her godmother. Cabello's mother took night courses to study English. Cabello's father was unable to obtain a visa at the time and joined the family approximately 18 months later.

Cabello's mother—a trained architect with a degree earned in Cuba—initially worked at Marshalls, stacking shoes, until one day, two other Cuban women approached her at work and told her that they had a brother who worked in architecture; she was told that the brother needed someone who worked in AutoCAD, and Cabello's mother learned the program in a week. In time, she had earned enough money to move out of her father's colleague's house and into an apartment with her children. Cabello's mother and father eventually formed a construction company named after Camila and Sofia. Cabello acquired American citizenship in 2008.

Cabello attended Miami Palmetto High School, but left during the 2012–2013 school year (while she was in 9th grade) to pursue her singing career. Later, she earned her high school diploma.

== Career ==
=== 2012–2016: The X Factor and Fifth Harmony ===
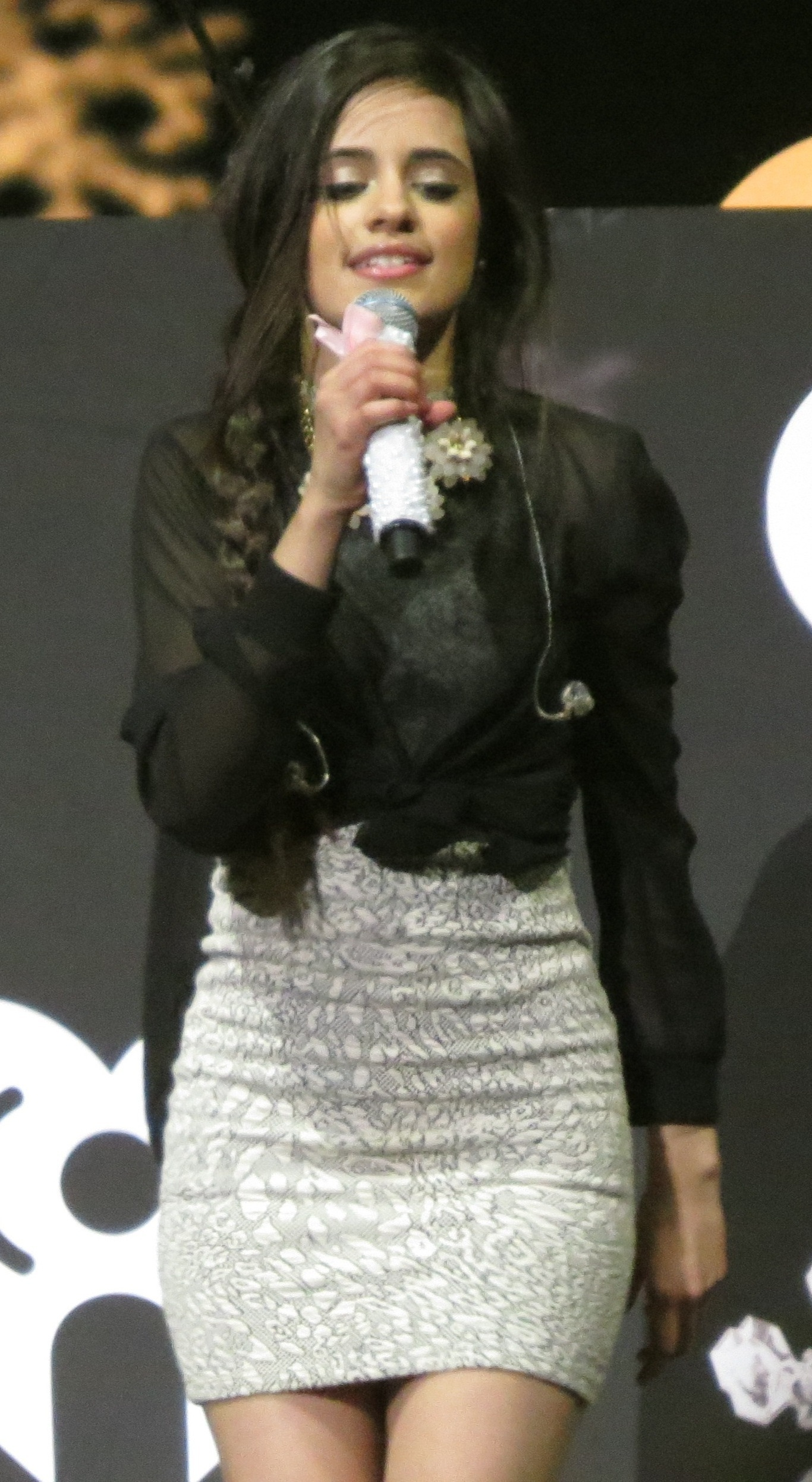
Cabello performing with Fifth Harmony at the 93.3 FLZ Jingle Ball in Tampa, Florida, in 2013

Camila Cabello auditioned for the TV talent competition show The X Factor in Greensboro, North Carolina, with Aretha Franklin's "Respect"; however, her audition was not aired because the series did not get the rights for the song. After elimination during the "bootcamp" portion of the process in Miami, Florida, Cabello was called back to the stage along with other contestants Ally Brooke, Normani, Lauren Jauregui, and Dinah Jane to form the girl group that would later become known as Fifth Harmony. After finishing in third place on the show, they signed a joint deal with Syco Music, owned by Simon Cowell, and Epic Records, L.A. Reid's record label.

The group released the EP Better Together (2013) along with the studio albums Reflection (2015) and 7/27 (2016). The latter two generated the singles "Worth It" and "Work from Home", respectively, which reached the top 10 in several international charts. From 2013 through the end of 2016, Cabello performed in various tours with Fifth Harmony. In November 2015, Cabello collaborated with Canadian singer Shawn Mendes on a duet titled "I Know What You Did Last Summer", a song they wrote together. The single charted at number 20 in the US and 18 in Canada and was certified platinum by the Recording Industry Association of America (RIAA). On October 14, 2016, American rapper Machine Gun Kelly released a joint single with Cabello called "Bad Things", which reached a peak of number four on the US Billboard Hot 100 songs chart. Also that year, Time magazine included Cabello on "The 25 Most Influential Teens of 2016" list.

On December 18, 2016, Fifth Harmony announced Cabello's departure, with both sides giving contradictory explanations of the circumstances for her exit. She appeared in a previously taped performance with the group on Dick Clark's New Year's Rockin' Eve at the end of 2016. Writing about Cabello's time in the group, a Billboard journalist noted it is "rather uncommon for someone to stand out in a collective as much as Cabello has over the past years."

=== 2017–2018: Breakthrough with Camila ===
On January 25, 2017, "Love Incredible", a collaboration with Norwegian DJ Cashmere Cat, leaked online. The official version of the song was released on February 16 and later featured on Cashmere's debut studio album, 9 (2017). Cabello also recorded "Hey Ma" with rappers Pitbull and J Balvin for The Fate of the Furious soundtrack (2017). The Spanish version of the single and its music video were released on March 10, 2017, and the English version was released on April 6. The singer was also featured on a collaboration with Major Lazer, Travis Scott and Quavo for the song "Know No Better".

In May 2017, Cabello announced the future release of her first studio album, at the time titled The Hurting. The Healing. The Loving., which she described as "the story of my journey from darkness into light, from a time when I was lost to a time when I found myself again". Her debut solo single "Crying in the Club" was released on May 19, 2017, followed by a performance at the 2017 Billboard Music Awards. The single peaked at number 47 in the United States. She joined Bruno Mars' 24K Magic World Tour as an opening act for several shows in 2017 and partnered with clothing brand Guess as the face of their 2017 Fall campaign.

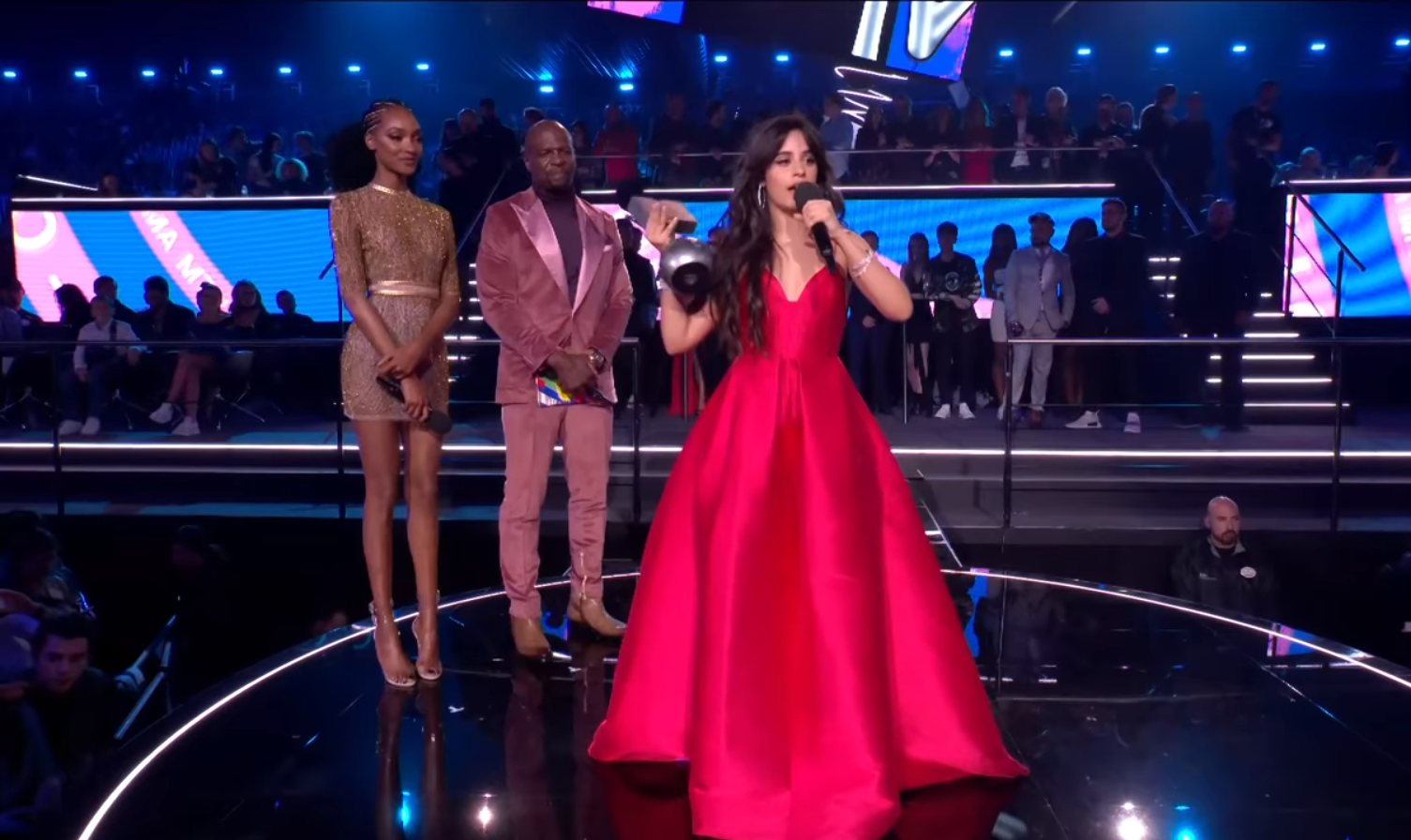
Cabello accepting the Best Video award for "Havana" at the 2018 MTV Europe Music Awards

New writing and recording sessions for her debut album, influenced by the success of her single "Havana" featuring Young Thug, postponed the album's original release date. The single reached number one in Australia, Canada, the United Kingdom, Ireland, France, Hungary and the United States. A commercial success, it also spent seven weeks atop the US Mainstream Top 40 airplay chart. The song became Spotify's most-streamed song ever by a solo female artist in June 2018, with over 888 million streams at the time. Titled Camila, her debut album is a pop record containing Latin-influenced songs and ballads. Camila was released on January 12, 2018, and debuted at number one in the United States with 119,000 album-equivalent units, including 65,000 from pure album sales. The album was eventually certified platinum in the country. "Real Friends" and "Never Be the Same" were released in the same day on December 7, 2017, the latter becoming her third top 10 entry on the Hot 100, peaking at Number 6. "Havana" and "Never Be the Same" made Cabello the first artist to top the Mainstream Top 40 and Adult Top 40 airplay charts with the first two singles from a debut studio album. She later won an MTV Video Music Award for Video of the Year for "Havana".

In April 2018, Cabello embarked on the Never Be the Same Tour, her first headlining concert tour as a solo artist. She was featured in "Sangria Wine", a song she recorded with Pharrell Williams. Cabello released the song live during the tour. In May 2018, Cabello made a cameo appearance in Maroon 5's music video for "Girls Like You". In the same month, she began performing as the opening act for American singer-songwriter Taylor Swift in her Reputation Stadium Tour in between the European leg of the Never Be the Same Tour. She headlined an arena for the first time on July 31, 2018, at the Mohegan Sun Arena in Uncasville, Connecticut. Cabello was featured in the remix version of "Beautiful", a song from American singer Bazzi. The remix was released on August 2. On October 9, 2018, Cabello released the video single "Consequences", having first surprised 12 of her biggest fans in advance with a "Most Amazing Mystery Gift & Personal Letter".

In December 2018, she was nominated for two Grammys: Best Pop Solo Performance for a live version of "Havana" and Best Pop Vocal Album for Camila. Her performance of "Havana" with guests Ricky Martin, J Balvin and Young Thug at the start of the ceremony made her the first female Latin artist to open the show.

=== 2019–2020: Romance ===
In October 2018, Cabello announced she would start working on new music in the new year after the holidays. In April 2019, it was announced that Cabello would star in an upcoming film adaptation of Cinderella, directed by Kay Cannon for Sony Pictures.

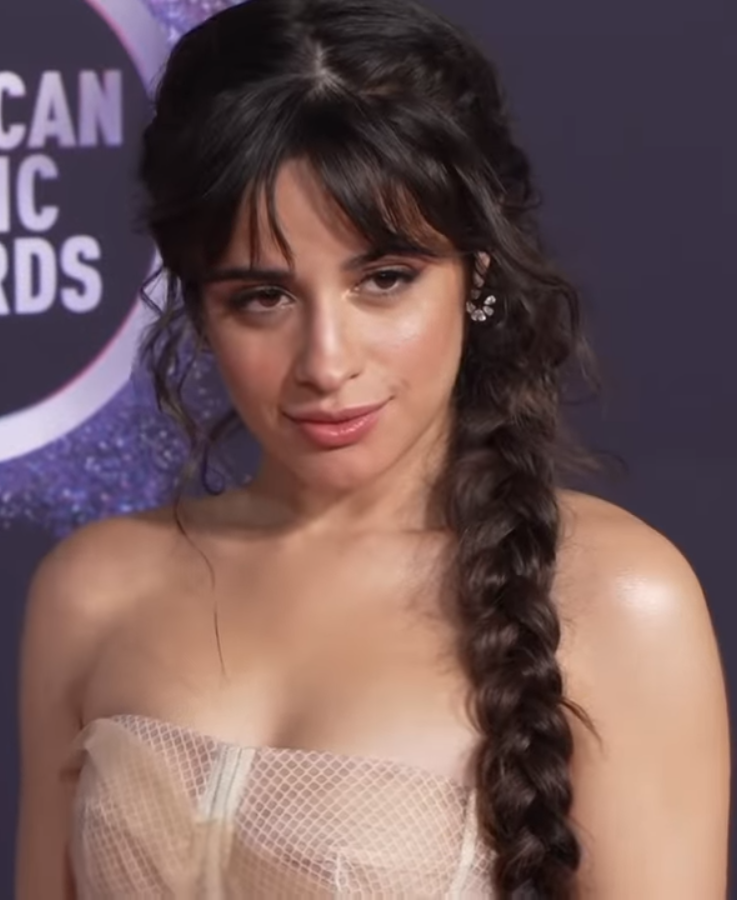
Cabello at the 2019 American Music Awards red carpet

On June 21, 2019, Cabello released "Señorita" with Canadian singer Shawn Mendes, along with the music video. The song debuted at number two on the US Billboard Hot 100 chart and marked Mendes' and Cabello's second collaboration, following "I Know What You Did Last Summer" (2015). In August, "Señorita" climbed to the number one position on the Hot 100, making it Cabello's second single to top the chart. "Señorita" reached Number 1 in over 30 countries. It earned a nomination for the Grammy Award for Best Pop Duo/Group Performance. According to the International Federation of the Phonographic Industry (IFPI), "Señorita" was the third best-selling song of 2019 globally. She also recorded the song "South of the Border" with British singer-songwriter Ed Sheeran and American rapper Cardi B, which was released in July 2019 and reached Number 4 on the UK Singles Chart.

On September 1, 2019, Cabello posted a clip on Instagram, teasing the release of her second studio album Romance. Two days later, she announced the first two singles from the album, "Liar" and "Shameless", which were released on September 5, followed by two promotional singles "Cry for Me" and "Easy" in October 2019. Romance was released on December 6, 2019, and was supposed to be supported by the Romance Tour in 2020, until its cancelation due to the COVID-19 pandemic. "Living Proof" was released with the pre-orders of the album on November 15, 2019. Romance debuted and peaked at Number 3 on the US Billboard 200 and reached Number 1 in Canada. It also reached the top 10 in 12 countries, including Australia, New Zealand and Spain. The fourth single from the album, "My Oh My" featuring DaBaby entered the top 20 on the Billboard Hot 100, peaking at Number 12; it also peaked at Number 1 on US Mainstream Top 40.

In December 2019, posts from Cabello's now-defunct Tumblr account, dating between 2012 and 2013, surfaced in which she had used racial slurs and posted racist memes about Black, Asian, and Mexican people. She apologized on Twitter for the posts, which she called "horrible and hurtful". She said that she was "deeply ashamed" that she had ever used such language.

She also began attending weekly racial healing sessions with the National Compadres Network, a California-based racial equity network. "It created a space where I was held accountable," she said. "You get corrected, you have homework, and you learn. That's how you move forward. Now I know better so I can do better."

In mid-March 2020, Cabello participated in iHeart Media's Living Room Concert for America, a benefit to raise awareness and funds for the COVID-19 pandemic.

=== 2021–2023: Cinderella, Familia and The Voice ===
On July 23, 2021, Cabello released "Don't Go Yet" as the lead single from her third studio album Familia, announced alongside the release of the single. On October 15, 2021, Cabello premiered "La Buena Vida", from Familia, during her NPR Tiny Desk Concert. On October 29, 2021, Cabello released "Oh Na Na" with Myke Towers and Tainy, though it is not included on the album. Familia was named by Forbes one of the most anticipated pop albums of 2022. In early September, Cabello performed "Don't Go Yet" at the BBC Live Lounge. She also performed a cover of Olivia Rodrigo's "Good 4 U", which later won the iHeartRadio Music Award for Best Cover Performance.

In the latter half of 2021, Cabello appeared in an adaptation of Cinderella, which was released in select theatres and digitally on Amazon Prime Video on September 3, 2021. Cinderella was the most-watched streaming movie over the Labour Day weekend, as well as the most-watched movie musical yet in 2021. The film received mixed reviews from critics. However, Cabello's performance received favorable reviews. Richard Roeper of the Chicago Sun-Times gave the film 3 out of 4 stars and praised Cabello for her performance, saying "she has a real knack for comedy", and IndieWire remarked, "In her cinematic debut, the pop star stitches up a charming performance in an oft-told fairy tale." In an interview with The One Show in July, Cabello said she would like to continue acting.

In November 2021, Cabello released a cover of the Bing Crosby song "I'll Be Home for Christmas" exclusively on Amazon Music. It reached number two on the Billboard Bubbling Under Hot 100, before peaking at Number 71 on the Billboard Hot 100. It also peaked at Number 58 on the Billboard Holiday 100 and Number 24 on the UK Singles Chart, marking Cabello's 13th Top 40 hit in the UK. Cabello performed the single at the Michael Bublé's Christmas in the City special on NBC and for PBS' In Performance at The White House: Spirit of the Season. In November 2022, Cabello's "I'll Be Home for Christmas" was released on all streaming platforms.

On December 6, 2021, it was announced that Cabello would open for Coldplay during the Latin American leg of their Music of the Spheres World Tour in September 2022. She opened for them in Colombia, Peru, and Chile, with additional dates added. She also performed at Rock in Rio that same month.

On February 21, 2022, Cabello announced that her collaboration with Ed Sheeran titled "Bam Bam" would arrive on March 4, 2022. The song was released that day, with a music video accompanying. Cabello debuted the song with a performance on The Late Late Show with James Corden on the day of release. Cabello and Sheeran performed "Bam Bam" together for the first time live at the Concert For Ukraine benefit at Resorts World Arena in Birmingham. "Bam Bam" peaked at number 5 on the Billboard Global 200 chart, marking Cabello's highest peak since the chart's creation in 2020. It also peaked at 21 on the Billboard Hot 100, and inside the top 10 in Canada and the UK. "Bam Bam" earned a nomination for the Grammy Award for Best Pop Duo/Group Performance.

On April 8, 2022, Familia was released and accompanied by a virtual TikTok concert 'immersive performance' titled "Familia: Welcome to the Family". Familia was met with positive reviews from critics, with NME, The Guardian and Rolling Stone all giving it 4/5 stars. Reviewing positively for NME, Nick Levine called the album "[Cabello's] richest and most compelling album yet," having delved into her heritage and psyche. In a similar review, Rolling Stone critic Tomás Mier wrote that the album is "an imperfect yet revealing mosaic of Cabello's Cuban [and] Mexican heritage." While noting the multiple changes in style as quite disorienting, Mier complimented the album's raw and honest lyrics, comparing it to reading Cabello's diary. In a review for The Guardian, Alim Kheraj praised the album's vibrant Latin motifs—"honest and humming with artistic intent"—and noted the recurring theme of "self-sabotage and paranoia".

Familia debuted at number 10 on the US Billboard 200, marking Cabello's 3rd Top ten album. It also debuted at number six in Canada, number nine in the UK, and number four in Spain, the latter marking Cabello's 2nd highest debut there.

On May 9, 2022, it was announced Cabello would headline the UEFA Champions League Final on May 28. On May 28, 2022, Cabello performed "Señorita", "Havana", "Bam Bam" and "Don't Go Yet" during the UEFA Champions League Final opening ceremony. The performance is the most viewed video on UEFA's channel. After the performance, Cabello subsequently tweeted the spectators were "very rude" for "singing their own teams so loud during our performance" leading to controversy. Cabello released 'Road to the UEFA Champion's League Final', a Behind the Scenes look at preparing for the performance, on her YouTube channel.

On May 15, 2022, Cabello announced via her TikTok account that she would be a coach on the US version of The Voice for its twenty-second season replacing Kelly Clarkson. In October 2022, it was confirmed that Cabello would not return for the twenty-third season.

On July 27, 2022 Stromae released a remix of his song "Mon amour" starring Cabello, with an accompanying music video that is a play on shows like Love Island. Cabello provided a verse she recorded in LA and sang in French for the song. In September 2022, Cabello departed Epic Records and signed to Interscope Records, a label of Universal Music Group. She also released a collaboration with Camilo titled "Ambulancia", which is on Camilo's album De adentro pa afuera. In December 2022, Cabello released her third non-album collaboration of 2022, a remix of "Ku Lo Sa" by Oxlade.

=== 2024–present: C,XOXO ===
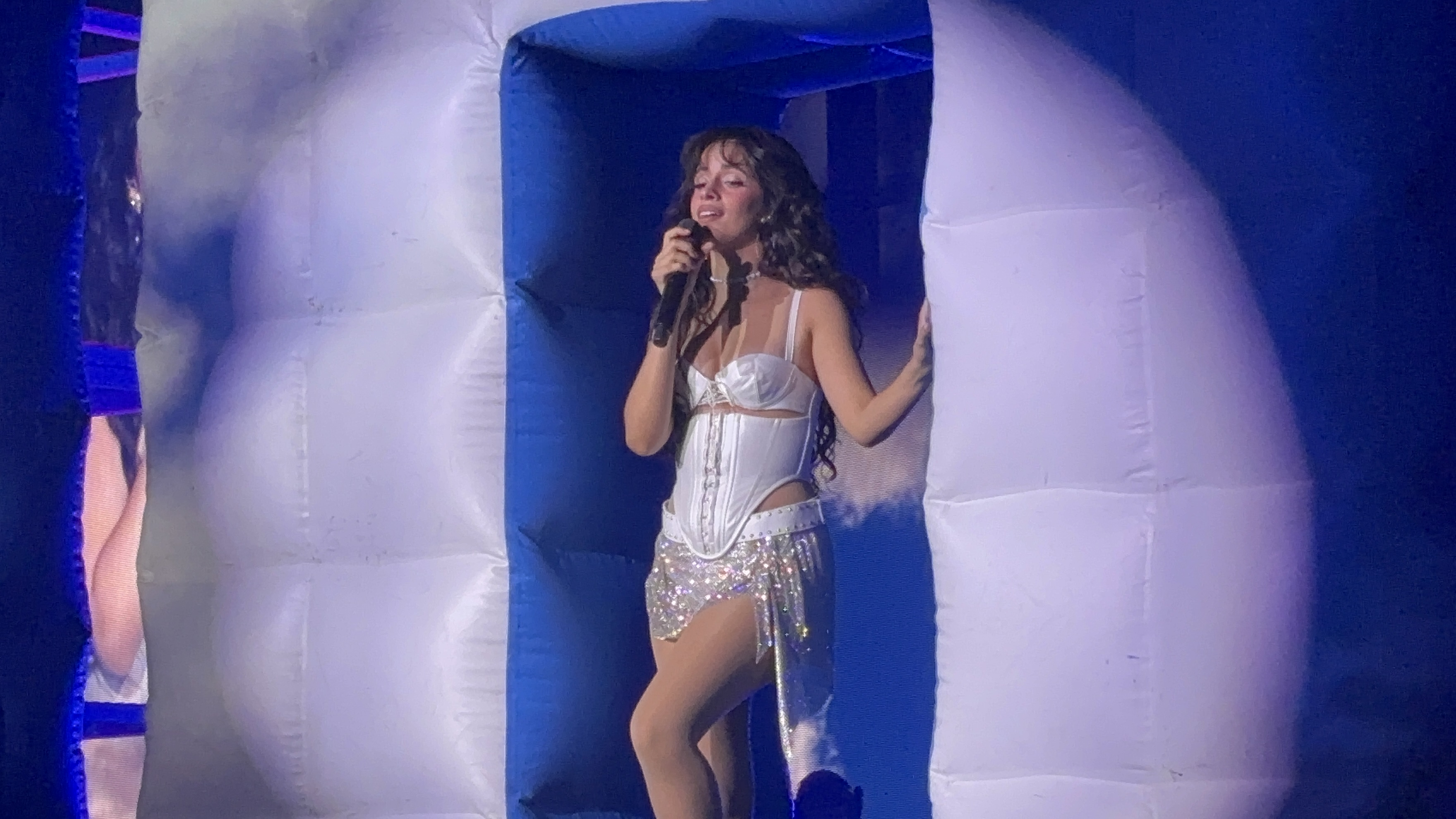
Camila Cabello performing in Sydney, Australia in August 2025

Cabello started teasing her new song "I Luv It" on March 5, 2024. It was released on March 27, and it is a collaboration with Playboi Carti. Rolling Stone branded the song as the beginning of her "hyperpop" era. It is the lead single for her fourth studio album C,XOXO, which was announced on May 6 and released on June 28, 2024. She released another single, "He Knows" (featuring Lil Nas X), on May 10. The third single, "Hot Uptown", featuring Drake, was released on June 28, 2024.

A deluxe edition of the album (called Magic City Edition) was released on September 6, 2024, alongside the single "Godspeed". Cabello performed the song, as well as the track "June Gloom", at the 2024 MTV Video Music Awards. In 2025, Cabello appeared in the Netflix program One Shot with Ed Sheeran, which features Sheeran performing songs as he takes an hour-long trip around Manhattan. He is shown having a chance encounter with Cabello, who then drives him around the city while they sing a duet of "Photograph".

== Artistry ==
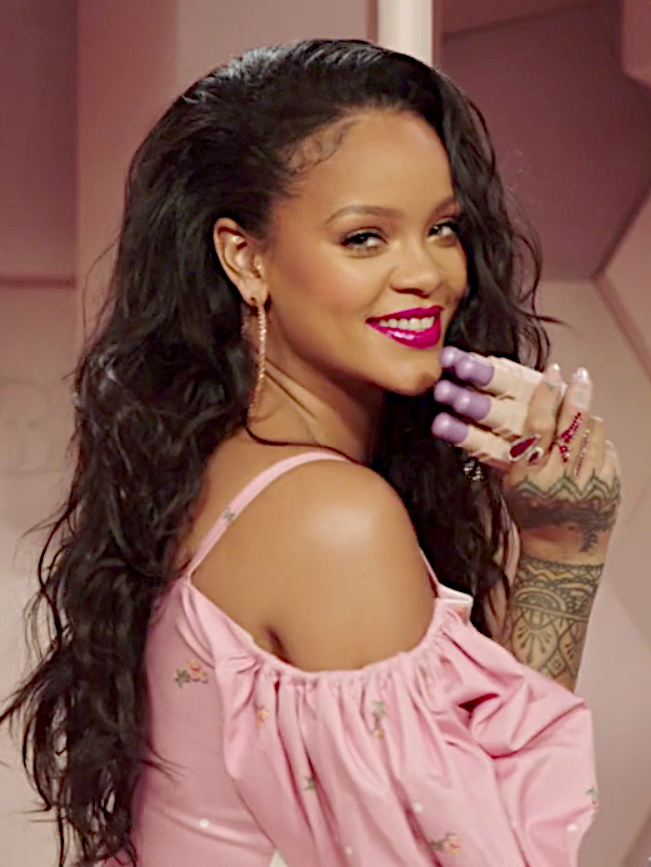
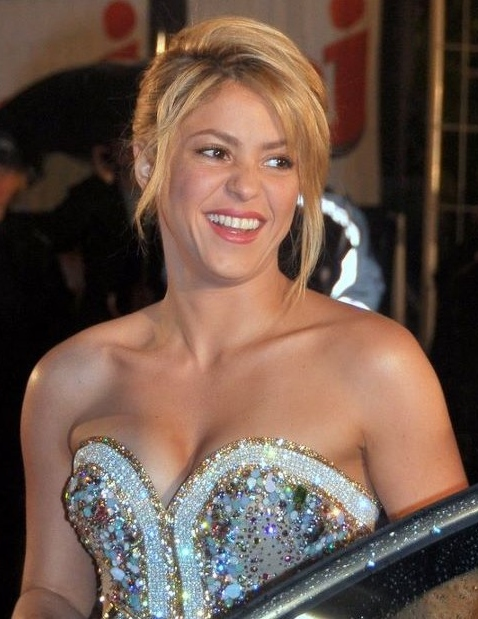
Cabello has cited singers such as Rihanna (left) and Shakira (right) as influences.

Cabello is a singer and songwriter who possesses a soprano vocal range. Her musical style is mainly rooted in a pop and R&B with the elements of Latin. She grew up listening to artists such as Alejandro Fernández and Celia Cruz.

Her debut studio album is a pop record, influenced by Latin music. The album incorporates elements of reggaeton, hip-hop, and dancehall and took inspiration from contemporary Latin artists such as Calle 13 and J Balvin, as well as from the songwriting of Taylor Swift and Ed Sheeran. Her second album was inspired by the "big sounds" of the 80s and Queen. She has also cited Michael Jackson, Madonna, Prince, Rihanna, Shakira, Alejandro Sanz, David Bisbal, Alejandro Fernández, Maná, Beyoncé, Christina Aguilera, John Mayer, Demi Lovato and Eminem as influences. (Note: Attributed to multiple sources)

== Philanthropy ==
In February 2016, Cabello announced she had partnered with Save the Children to design a limited-edition "Love Only" T-shirt to help raise awareness of issues involving girls' equal access to education, health care, and opportunities to succeed. In June 2016, Cabello, producer Benny Blanco, and members of the nonprofit arts organization OMG Everywhere helped to create the charity single "Power in Me". Cabello has also partnered with the Children's Health Fund, a non-profit dedicated to providing health care to low-income families with children.

On April 3, 2017, Cabello performed at Zedd's WELCOME! Fundraising Concert, which raised money for ACLU. Cabello sang to patients at UCLA Mattel Children's Hospital on May 8, 2017. In late 2017, she joined Lin-Manuel Miranda and multiple other Latin artists on the song "Almost Like Praying" for Puerto Rico hurricane relief. Cabello also announced she was donating all proceeds of "Havana" to the ACLU for DREAMers.

Cabello donated portions of proceeds from VIP sale packages to the Children's Health Fund while on the 2018 Never Be the Same tour. On July 13, 2018, she performed a concert in San Juan and donated a portion of the concert's proceeds to Hurricane Maria Relief Fund. In November 2018, Cabello became an ambassador for Save the Children.

In March 2019, Cabello announced she donated $10,000 to a GoFundMe campaign for a homeless immigrant. In September 2019, Cabello pledged to raise $250,000 for Save the Children organization. In October 2019, Cabello performed at the We Can Survive concert which donates to breast cancer research. On October 22, 2019, Cabello appeared with the Duke and Duchess of Cambridge at Kensington Palace in support of the finalists for the BBC Radio 1 Teen Heroes Awards.

In March 2020, Cabello participated in iHeart Media's Living Room Concert for America, a benefit to raise awareness and funds for the COVID-19 pandemic. In March and April 2020, Cabello participated in Global Citizen Festival's Together at Home virtual concert to raise awareness and funds for the COVID-19 pandemic. In May 2020, Cabello, alongside Shawn Mendes, joined protests in Miami for racial justice after the murder of George Floyd. In July 2021, she expressed support for the 2021 Cuban protests against the country's government.

In January 2021, Cabello partnered with the nonprofit Movement Voter Fund to launch The Healing Justice project, a project to identify ten organizations to receive grants to pay for mental health resources for their frontline workers. Cabello pledged the seed money for the venture, $250,000, and has pledged to continue to support the project going forward. So far the project has given grants to several organisations, including Muslim Woman For, Freedom Inc and QLatinx.

Cabello is an outspoken advocate for addressing climate change and regularly speaks about this on her social media and in interviews. In September 2021, Cabello recruited over 60 artists to sign an open letter to several entertainment companies, including Amazon, Facebook and Apple Inc., calling on them to ask Congress to pass the climate action that President Joe Biden called for in his Build Back Better agenda.

In March 2022, Cabello performed at the Concert for Ukraine benefit concert. The two-hour benefit show was put on to raise money for the Disasters Emergency Committee's (DEC) Ukraine Humanitarian Appeal following the Russian invasion of Ukraine. Cabello performed a cover of "Fix You" by Coldplay and her single "Bam Bam", with Ed Sheeran joining her on stage for their first live performance of the song together.

In May 2022, Cabello launched and hosted a benefit concert to support the emergency "Protect Our Kids" fund. The singer has teamed with Lambda Legal and Equality Florida to help protect LGBTQ+ students and their families from Florida's so-called "Don't Say Gay or Trans" bill.

As part of her collaboration with Pepsi for UEFA Champions League, Cabello is among the music and football talent that will be supporting #Football4Refugees, an appeal launched by United Nations High Commissioner for Refugees (UNHCR), the UN Refugee Agency, to unite the global football community to raise funds for displaced people around the world.

On August 22, 2022, Cabello announced that she had provided vocals and written a song with Hans Zimmer for the documentary series Frozen Planet 2. Cabello called this an 'honour' and the song debuted on August 28, 2022, incorporated in the first trailer for the show. It won the award for Best Song/Score in a Trailer at the 2022 Hollywood Music in Media Awards.

== Awards and nominations ==
Among her awards, Cabello has won two Latin Grammy Awards, four American Music Awards, a Billboard Music Award, five MTV Europe Music Awards, two iHeartRadio Music Awards, four MTV Video Music Awards (including one for Video of the Year), three iHeartRadio Much Music Video Awards, and a Billboard Women in Music award for Breakthrough Artist.

== Personal life ==
Cabello purchased a 3,500-square-foot (330 m^{2}) home in the Hollywood Hills neighborhood of Los Angeles, in 2019. In December 2021, it was reported that she had sold the home for $4.3 million.

=== Relationships ===
Cabello was in a relationship with dating coach and writer Matthew Hussey, whom she met on the set of The Today Show. They dated from February 2018 to June 2019.

She began dating Canadian singer Shawn Mendes in July 2019. The relationship caused controversy, as both were accused of attempting to form a relationship for publicity, but Mendes insisted it was "definitely not a publicity stunt". The relationship was confirmed after the release of their song "Señorita". In November 2021, Cabello and Mendes announced their breakup.

In August 2022, Cabello began dating founder of Lox Club Austin Kevitch, whom she met through their mutual friend Nicholas Galitzine, Cabello's co-lead in Cinderella. In February 2023, it was announced the two had broken up.

=== Mental health ===
On May 28, 2020, in honor of Mental Health Awareness Month, Cabello wrote an article in WSJ Magazine about her experiences living with obsessive-compulsive disorder.

=== Views ===
Cabello, born in Cojímar, Havana, and who immigrated to the United States at age six, has frequently spoken about political and humanitarian issues in her native country. She has criticized the Cuban government as a dictatorship and highlighted ongoing crises involving shortages of food, medicine, electricity, and repression of dissent. In July 2021, amid widespread protests in Cuba over economic hardship, COVID-19 shortages, and government restrictions, Cabello used social media to raise awareness, posting about rising COVID deaths due to lack of resources and encouraging the hashtag #SOSCuba. She later shared a performance of the protest anthem "Patria y Vida" with artists including Yotuel.

Cabello continued addressing the situation in subsequent years. In February 2026, amid intensified reports of blackouts, food scarcity, medical shortages, and economic collapse, she published a lengthy personal statement on Instagram, X, and other platforms. In the post, she described Cuba as enduring "67 years of a failing dictatorship and an oppressive regime," detailing severe conditions: people "starving, looking for food in trash heaps," hospitals without medicine requiring family shipments from abroad, prolonged power outages causing food spoilage and water issues, and risks of imprisonment or disappearance for peaceful protesters (including children as young as 13) or even online expression. She noted maintaining contact with family on the island, sending aid (medicine, food, clothing). She referenced the desperation driving raft migrations across the Florida Straits. Cabello urged donations to Caritas Cuba (via Friends of Caritas Cuba) to provide humanitarian relief, emphasizing the crisis as beyond politics and focused on human suffering.

The statement received extensive media coverage and drew polarized responses. Many praised her for amplifying the crisis and using her platform to advocate for Cubans under repression. Others criticized her, accusing the statement of downplaying the role of long-standing U.S. sanctions and embargo in exacerbating economic difficulties, or aligning with anti-government exile views. Cabello has consistently attributed primary responsibility for the hardships to decades of authoritarian rule and internal mismanagement.

== Discography ==
- Camila (2018)
- Romance (2019)
- Familia (2022)
- C,XOXO (2024)

== Tours ==
=== Headlining ===
- Never Be the Same Tour (2018–2019)
- Yours, C Tour (2025)

=== Opening act ===
- Bruno Mars – 24K Magic World Tour (2017)
- Taylor Swift – Reputation Stadium Tour (2018)
- Coldplay – Music of the Spheres World Tour (2022)

== Filmography ==
=== Film ===
Year	Title	Role	Notes
2015	Taylor Swift: The 1989 World Tour Live	Herself	Concert film
2018	Taylor Swift: Reputation Stadium Tour	Herself	Concert film
2020	Shawn Mendes: In Wonder	Herself	Documentary film
2021	Cinderella	Cinderella	
2023	Trolls Band Together	Viva (voice)	
2024	Rob Peace	Naya	
TBA	Cut Off	TBA	Post-production

=== Television ===
Year	Title	Role	Notes
2012–2013	The X Factor	Herself	Contestant: season 2; Guest: 1 episode in season 3
2014	Faking It	Herself	Episode: "The Ecstasy and the Agony"
2015	Barbie: Life in the Dreamhouse	Herself	Episode: "Sisters' Fun Day"
2016	The Ride	Herself	Episode: "Fifth Harmony"
2017	One Love Manchester	Herself	Television special
2018	Dancing on Ice	Herself	Guest: 1 episode in series 10
2019	Saturday Night Live	Herself	Musical guest: episode 3 of season 45
2019	The Kacey Musgraves Christmas Show	Herself	Special
2020	Saturday Night Takeaway	Herself	Guest Announcer: Season 16 Episode 1
2020	iHeart Living Room Concert for America	Herself	Concert special
2020	One World: Together at Home	Herself	Television special
2021, 2022	The Voice	Herself / Advisor / Coach	Team Legend Battle Round Advisor (season 21); Coach (season 22)
2022	Saturday Night Live	Herself	Musical guest: episode 17 of season 47
2022	Carpool Karaoke	Herself	Camila Cabello Carpool Karaoke

=== Web ===
Year	Title	Role	Notes
2018	Camila Cabello: Made in Miami	Herself	Short documentary film
2018	King of the Golden Sun	Addison Jones	2 episodes
2020	Dear Class of 2020	Herself	Web television special
2020	Priceless Experiences at Home	Herself	2 episodes
