= June Gloom (song) =

Song by Camila Cabello

from the album C,XOXO
- Released: June 28, 2024
- Length: 3:00
- Label: Geffen; Interscope
- Songwriters: Camila Cabello; Jasper Harris; Zac; Finatik; El Guincho
- Producers: Jasper Harris; El Guincho; FNZ

Visualizer
- "June Gloom" on YouTube

"June Gloom" is a song by American singer Camila Cabello from her fourth studio album, C,XOXO (2024).

== Background and live performances ==
In July 2019, Cabello began dating Canadian singer Shawn Mendes. The relationship caused controversy, as both were accused of attempting to form a relationship for publicity, but Mendes insisted it was "definitely not a publicity stunt". The relationship was confirmed after the release of their song "Señorita". In November 2021, Cabello and Mendes announced their breakup.

In February 2023, Mendes and American singer-songwriter Sabrina Carpenter were seen holding their hands together, and Entertainment Tonight reported that they're "seeing each other"; however, on April 14, Mendes and Cabello were seen together at Coachella in the crowd sharing a kiss. They were later spotted days later walking hand in hand while strolling the streets of Venice, California. Later that day, Cabello shared a sample of the song's demo to her Instagram, with the lyrics saying:

"I guess I'll fuck around and find out / Are you coming to Coachella? / If you don't, it's whatever / If you do, honey, it'll be all I think about."

In August, Carpenter released her sixth studio album, Short n' Sweet. Its two tracks—"Taste" and "Coincidence"—were speculated to refer to both Cabello and Mendes. On the same moth, Cabello uploaded TikTok video using "June Gloom" as a background music, which caused a great deal of gossip between them. The video includes the lyrics such as:

"She's cool, I heard / Won't act surprised, I saw the pictures, we're a / House fire, for sure / Hope it'll burn out, but it just gets bigger / If she's so amazing, why are you on this side of town?/ If you like her so much, what are you here trying to find out?"

While performing at Rock in Rio Lisbon 2024, Cabello previewed a bunch of songs from her fourth studio album C,XOXO, including the track "June Gloom". Right before previewing the song, Cabello began to explain about the song's meaning, saying it was about reconnecting with an ex, who many people speculated to be Mendes.

In September, Cabello performed "June Gloom" at the 2024 MTV Music Video Awards, along with "Godspeed". The same month, she released Magic City edition of C,XOXO, including new tracks, such as "Godspeed", "Baby Pink" and "Can Friends Kiss?". The two latter songs sparked speculation that their lyrics are about Mendes. In October, she posted two photos of herself with the caption in her Instagram: "That's why they write these songs about me, that's the proof". In December 11, Mendes addressed about the love triangle between him, Carpenter and Cabello.

== Critic reception ==
=== Accolades ===
List of year-end lists
Publication	List	Rank	Ref.
Atwood Magazine	Atwood Magazine's Best Music of 2024!	30	

== Personnel ==
- Camila Cabello – vocals, songwriting
- Pablo Díaz-Reixa – programming, sampler, drums, 5-string banjo, songwriting
- Jasper Harris – synthesizer, bass, songwriting
- Dale Becker – mastering
- Jon Castelli – mixing
- Salvador "Better Call Sal" Majail – engineering
- Bart Schoudel – engineering
- Pedro Kayat – engineering assistance
