= El Guincho =

Spanish producer (born 1983)

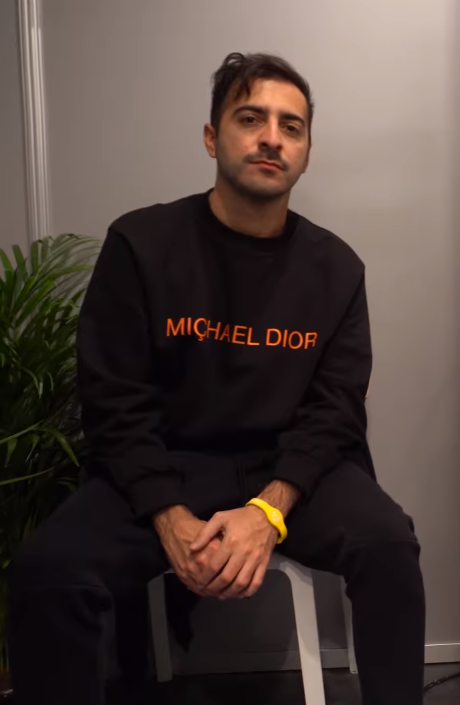
- El Guincho in 2017

Background information
- Born: Pablo Díaz-Reixa; November 17, 1983 (age 42); Las Palmas de Gran Canaria, Canary Islands, Spain
- Genres: Latin pop; avant-garde; Latin trap; psychedelic pop; tropicalia
- Occupations: Musician; singer; record producer
- Years active: 2006–present
- Labels: Young Turks; XL

Pablo Díaz-Reixa (born November 17, 1983), professionally known as El Guincho, is a Spanish musician, singer, and record producer.

Díaz-Reixa rose to prominence with his 2008 album, Alegranza. His musical style relies heavily on the use of sampling and incorporates elements of Afrobeat, dub, tropicália and rock and roll. Díaz-Reixa has described his style of production as "space-age exotica". He primarily produces music with a Roland SP-404.

== Early life ==
Díaz-Reixa was born as an only child in Las Palmas de Gran Canaria, in the Canary Islands. After finishing high school, he moved to Barcelona, Spain, for college, where he majored in media studies. While in the city, he started to make music and was a member of the band Coconot.

== Career ==
=== Beginnings and first two albums: 2007–2014 ===
He released his first album, Folías, independently in 2007. In October 2008, he released his breakthrough album, Alegranza, which was well received by critics, including earning a "Best New Music" designation from Pitchfork. He would spend the next two years touring the album worldwide.

In September 2010, Díaz-Reixa released Pop Negro, under British independent label Young Turks. The album includes the now popular single "Bombay". Notably, he worked on Björk's 2011 album Biophilia. Previously, in 2008, he remixed her on Enjoyed: A Tribute to Björk's Post.

=== Hiperasia and producing for Rosalía: 2014–present ===
While temporarily living in his hometown of Las Palmas de Gran Canaria, Díaz-Reixa worked on a collection of music that would later be his next album, Hiperasia. With a departure from his tropical sound, the album takes influences from trap and electronic music, employing heavy use of Vocoder and Autotune. It was released in February 2016.

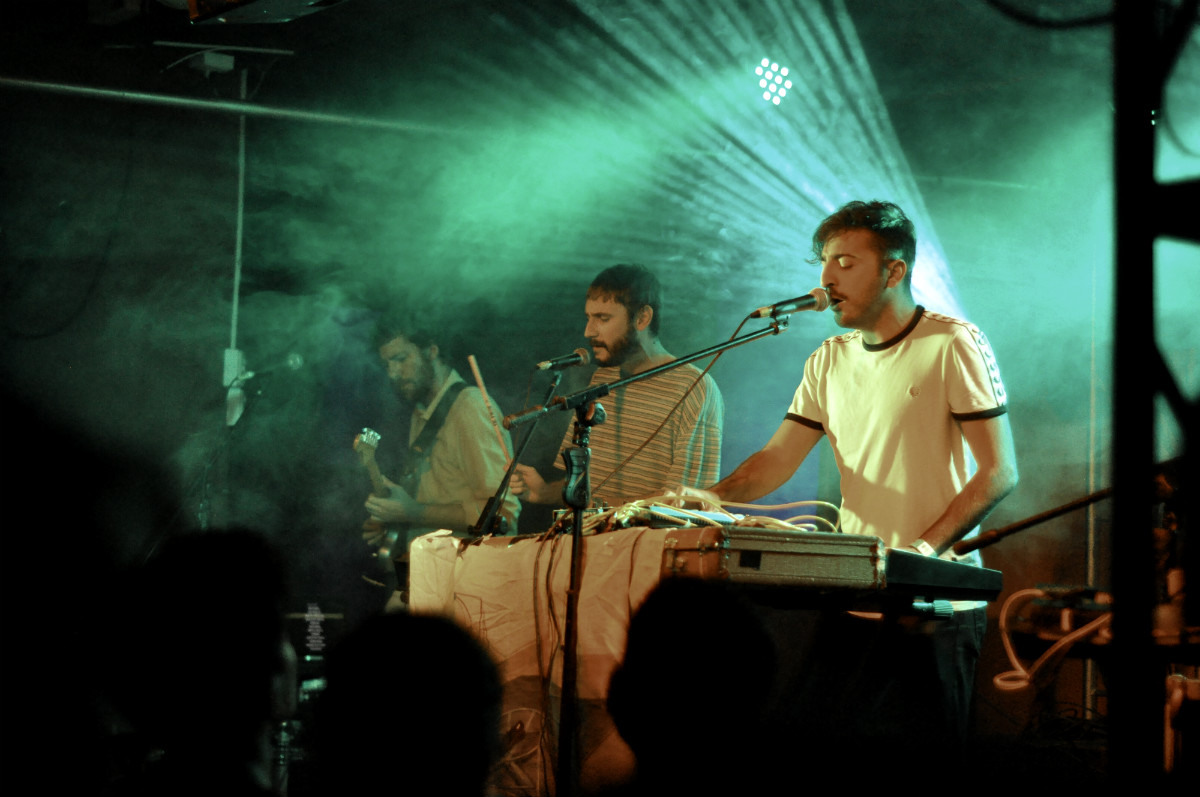
El Guincho (right) performing with his band in Lima, Peru, 2016.

That same year, Díaz-Reixa saw Spanish singer Rosalia live, and, fascinated by her sound, contacted her through social media to collaborate. He would later be sole producer of her second album El Mal Querer, released in 2018. The album received critical acclaim. At the 19th Latin Grammy Awards, the single "Malamente" was nominated for five awards, including Record of the Year, Song of the Year, Best Urban Fusion Performance, and Best Alternative Song, winning the latter two. The next year's ceremony, the album won for Album of the Year, Best Contemporary Pop Vocal Album and Best Recording Package, while the song "Pienso en tu mirá" received a nomination for Best Pop Song. Díaz-Reixa received won for Best Engineered Album. The album also won the Grammy Award for Best Latin Rock, Urban or Alternative Album at the 62nd Annual Grammy Awards.

In 2019, Díaz-Reixa co-produced and featured in the successful single "Con Altura", with Rosalía and J Balvin. In 2020, his work with artists like Rosalia, Aitana, and Paloma Mami earned him a Latin Grammy nomination for Producer of the Year.

== Personal life ==
Díaz-Reixa has lived in Barcelona since 2002. He is of partly Cuban descent through his grandmother, which he says was an inspiration on the Tropicalia influences on his earlier works.

== Discography ==
=== Studio albums ===
List of studio albums, with selected details
| Title | Details |
|---|---|
| Folías | Released: 2007; Label: DC/Luv Luv; Format: CD, LP, digital download |
| Alegranza | Released: October 13, 2008; Label: Young Turks; Format: CD, LP, digital download |
| Pop Negro | Released: September 13, 2010; Label: Young Turks; Format: CD, LP, digital download |
| Hiperasia | Released: February 12, 2016; Label: Everlasting Records/Canada; Format: CD, LP, digital download |

=== Extended plays ===
List of extended plays, with selected details
| Title | Details |
|---|---|
| Piratas de Sudamérica, Vol. 1 | Released: July 12, 2010; Label: Young; Format: Digital download |

=== Film soundtracks ===
| Year | Film | Song | Notes |
|---|---|---|---|
| 2025 | F1 | "Baja California" | Co-producer with Oscar Adler |

=== As producer ===
Credits
| Year | Title | Artist | Production | Songwriting | Technical |
|---|---|---|---|---|---|
| 2011 | "Biophilia" | Björk | | | check |
| 2012 | Una Montaña Es Una Montaña | Los Punsetes | check | | |
| 2014 | LPIV | Los Punsetes | check | | |
| 2018 | "Malamente" | Rosalía | check | check | check |
| 2018 | "Pienso en tu mirá" | Rosalía | check | | check |
| 2018 | El Mal Querer | Rosalía | check | check | check |
| 2018 | Espejo ("Intuición", "Noche") | Javiera Mena | (Note: Co-producer) | | |
| 2018 | Worldwide Angel | Bad Gyal | check | | |
| 2019 | Spoiler | Aitana | check | check | |
| 2019 | "Con Altura" | Rosalía featuring J Balvin and El Guincho | check | check | |
| 2019 | "Aute Cuture" | Rosalía | check | check | check |
| 2019 | "Yo x Ti, Tu x Mi" | Rosalía and Ozuna | check | check | |
| 2019 | "A Palé" | Rosalía | check | check | |
| 2020 | "Dolerme" | Rosalía | | check | |
| 2020 | "Juro Que" | Rosalía | check | check | |
| 2020 | Gore | Lous and the Yakuza | check | | |
| 2020 | "TKN" | Rosalía and Travis Scott | check | check | check |
| 2020 | "Sum Bout U" | 645AR featuring FKA Twigs | check | check | |
| 2021 | Warm Up | Bad Gyal | check | check | |
| 2021 | "Lo Vas a Olvidar" | Billie Eilish and Rosalía | | check | |
| 2021 | "Goteo" | Paloma Mami | check | check | |
| 2021 | Sound System: The Final Releases | Bad Gyal | check | check | |
| 2022 | Caprisongs | FKA Twigs | check | check | |
| 2022 | Motomami | Rosalía | check | check | |
| 2022 | "Killer" | FKA Twigs | check | | |
| 2022 | Fossora ("Ovule") | Björk | (Note: additional beat production) | | |
| 2024 | Brat ("Everything Is Romantic") | Charli XCX | check | check | |
| 2024 | C,XOXO | Camila Cabello | check | check | |
| 2024 | "Mantra" | Jennie | check | | |
| 2025 | Black Star | Amaarae | check | check | |
| 2025 | "De Madrugá" | Rosalía | check | check | |
| 2025 | "La Rumba del Perdón" | Rosalía | | check | |
| 2026 | "Hooligan" | BTS | check | check | |
| 2026 | "Housewife" | Tate McRae | check | check | |

=== Other appearances ===
List of other appearances, showing other performing artists, year released, and album name
| Title | Year | Other performer(s) | Album |
|---|---|---|---|
| "La Carretera" | 2014 | Javiera Mena | Otra Era |

== Awards and nominations ==
=== Grammy Awards ===
| Year | Category | Nominated work | Artist | Result | Ref. |
|---|---|---|---|---|---|
| 2020 | Best Latin Rock, Urban or Alternative Album | "El Mal Querer" (as producer and engineer) | Rosalía | Won | |

=== Latin Grammy Awards ===
| Year | Category | Nominated work | Artist | Result | Ref. |
|---|---|---|---|---|---|
| 2018 | Record of the Year | "Malamente" (as producer and engineer/songwriter) | Rosalía | Nominated | |
| 2018 | Song of the Year | "Malamente" (as producer and engineer/songwriter) | Rosalía | Nominated | |
| 2018 | Best Alternative Song | "Malamente" (as producer and engineer/songwriter) | Rosalía | Won | |
| 2019 | Record of the Year | "Aute Cuture" (as producer) | Rosalía | Nominated | |
| 2019 | Album of the Year | El Mal Querer (as producer and engineer) | Rosalía | Won | |
| 2019 | Best Contemporary Pop Vocal Album | El Mal Querer (as producer and engineer) | Rosalía | Won | |
| 2019 | Best Engineered Album | El Mal Querer (as producer and engineer) | Rosalía | Won | |
| 2019 | Best Pop Song | "Pienso en tu mirá" (as songwriter) | Rosalía | Nominated | |
| 2019 | Best Urban Song | "Con Altura" (as songwriter) | Rosalía and J Balvin featuring El Guincho | Won | |
| 2020 | Best Urban Song | "Yo x Ti, Tu x Mi" (as songwriter) | Rosalía and Ozuna | Won | |
| 2020 | Best Pop/Rock Song | "Dolerme" (as songwriter) | Rosalía | Nominated | |
| 2020 | Producer of the Year | El Guincho | | Nominated | |
| 2022 | Album of the Year | MOTOMAMI (Digital Album) (as producer and songwriter) | Rosalía | Won | |
| 2022 | Record of the Year | "LA FAMA" (as producer) | Rosalía ft. The Weeknd | Nominated | |

=== Other awards and nominations ===
| Year | Award | Category | Nominated work | Result | Ref. |
|---|---|---|---|---|---|
| 2011 | UK Music Video Awards | Best Indie/Rock Video - International | "Bombay" | Nominated | |
| 2016 | Berlin Music Video Awards | Best Editor | Comix | Nominated | |
| 2019 | MTV Video Music Awards | Best Latin | "Con Altura" (with Rosalía and J Balvin) | Won | |
| 2019 | MTV Video Music Awards | Best Choreography | "Con Altura" (with Rosalía and J Balvin) | Won | |
| 2019 | MTV Video Music Awards | Song of the Summer | "Con Altura" (with Rosalía and J Balvin) | Nominated | |
| 2019 | MTV Europe Music Awards | Best Video | "Con Altura" (with Rosalía and J Balvin) | Nominated | |
| 2019 | MTV Europe Music Awards | Best Collaboration | "Con Altura" (with Rosalía and J Balvin) | Won | |
| 2020 | Billboard Latin Music Awards | Latin Pop Song of the Year | "Con Altura" (with Rosalía and J Balvin) | Nominated | |
