= List of songs recorded by Camila Cabello =

Songs by American singer

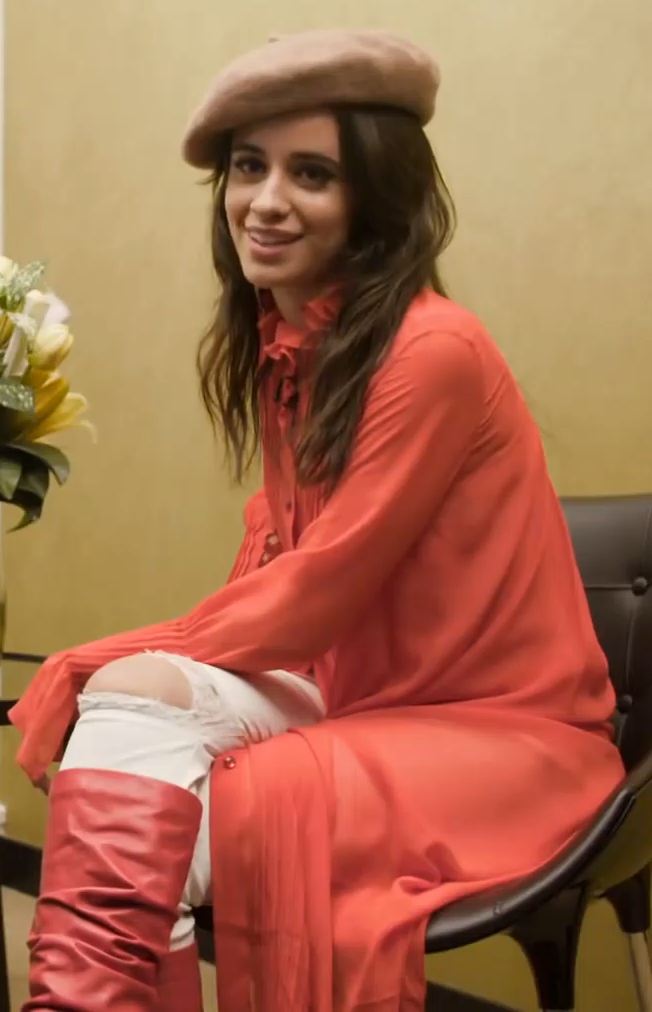
Camila Cabello for MTV International on December 7, 2017

Cuban-American singer Camila Cabello has recorded songs for two studio albums, one live album, single droplets and guest features. Her debut single as a solo artist was her collaboration with Shawn Mendes, "I Know What You Did Last Summer," released in November 2015, Cabello again released a collaborative single, "Bad Things," with Machine Gun Kelly in 2016, which was Cabello's first top 5 hit song on Billboard Hot 100. Before launching her debut album in 2017, Cabello also appeared as a featured artist on "Love Incredible" from Cashmere Cat's album 9, Pitbull and J Balvin's The Fate of the Furious soundtrack single "Hey Ma", and Lin-Manuel Miranda's charity single "Almost Like Praying," and contributed the song "Crown" to the Bright soundtrack (2017) in collaboration with music producer duo Grey. She also released the stand-alone single "Crying in the Club" along with the promotional single "I Have Questions."

Cabello's debut studio album Camila, released in January 2018, spawning three singles "Havana", "Never Be the Same", and "Consequences." She collaborated with other artist, including Young Thug, to create the pop album. Cabello appeared as a featured artist on Bazzi's song "Beautiful" (2018) during her first headlining tour Never Be the Same Tour (2018). Cabello performed a debut live performance on American Music Awards of 2018, for her single "Consequences" from her debut album and won four American Music Awards including New Artist of the Year. The debut album was nominated for Best Pop Vocal Album at the 61st Annual Grammy Awards. Cabello also performed her Grammy-nominated single "Havana" on 61st Annual Grammy Awards.

Before her second album cycle, Cabello firstly co-wrote and released the Latin Grammy Award for Record of the Year winning song "Mi Persona Favorita", which serves as the third single on Alejandro Sanz' twelfth studio album El Disco (2019). Then, Cabello appeared as a guest on the Kevin Parker co-wrote song "Find U Again" from Mark Ronson's studio album Late Night Feelings and the Ed Sheeran song "South of the Border" featuring Cabello and Cardi B. Cabello's sophomore studio album included the Shawn Mendes collaborative single "Señorita," "Liar," "Shameless," "Cry for Me," "Easy," and "My Oh My" featuring American rapper DaBaby. Cabello performed an album cut "First Man" as a tribute to her father instead of her then charting single "My Oh My."

Cabello then co-wrote her original song "Million to One" with Scott Harris, which appears on the soundtrack of her film debut Cinderella (2021). She also participated in the cover recording of "Perfect" by Ed Sheeran, "Rhythm Nation" by Janet Jackson, "You Gotta Be" by Des'ree, "Could Have Been Me" by the Struts, and the Gloria Estefan written classic "Let's Get Loud" by Jennifer Lopez.

== Songs ==
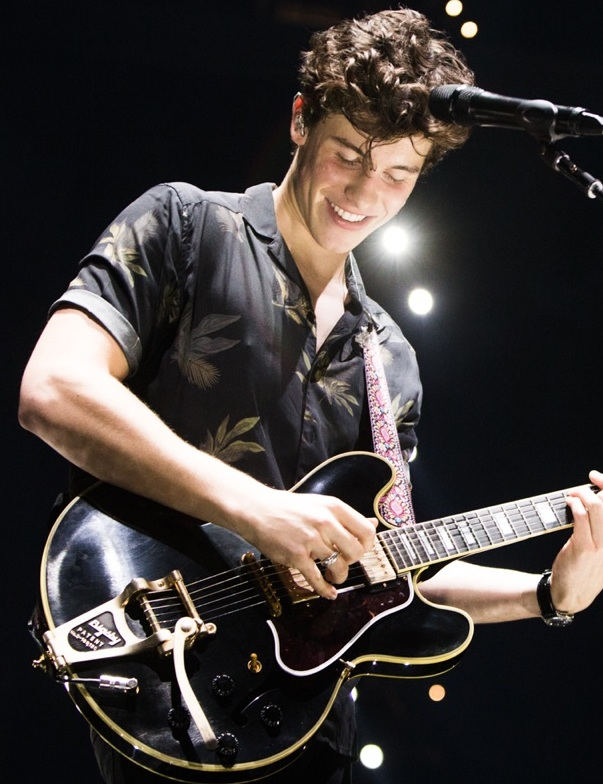
Shawn Mendes collaborated with Cabello on two singles, "I Know What You Did Last Summer," "Señorita," and two cover songs, "What a Wonderful World" and "The Christmas Song."

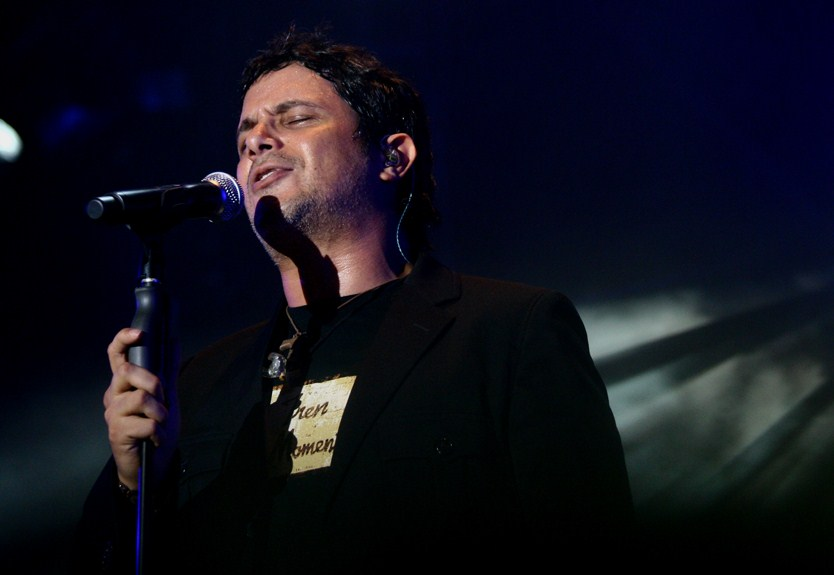
Grammys winner Alejandro Sanz and Cabello collaborated on "Mi Persona Favorita" from the album El Disco (2019).

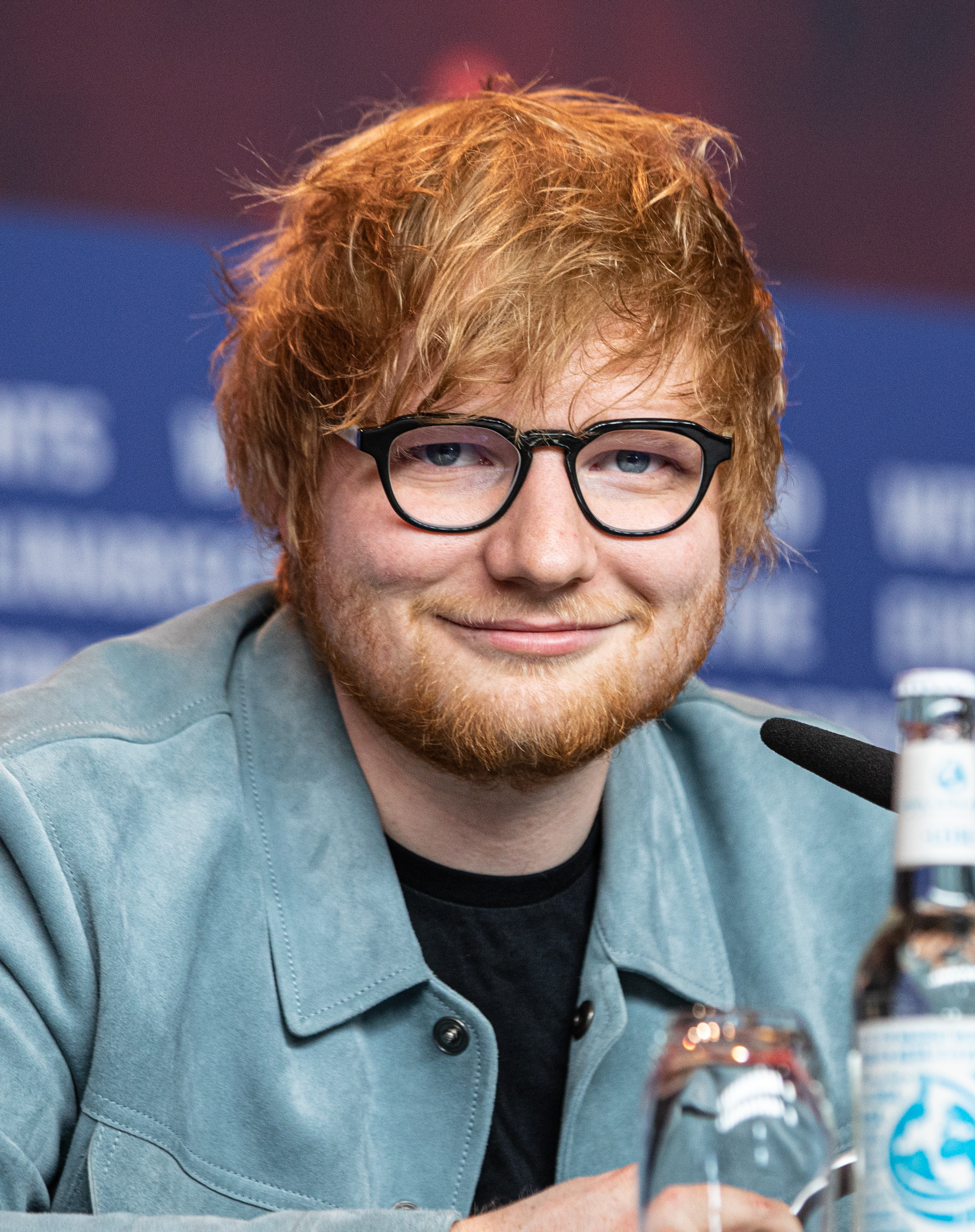
British singer-songwriter Ed Sheeran led the collaboration with Cabello and Cardi B on the song "South of the Border". Cabello and Sheeran later collaborated again on "Bam Bam".

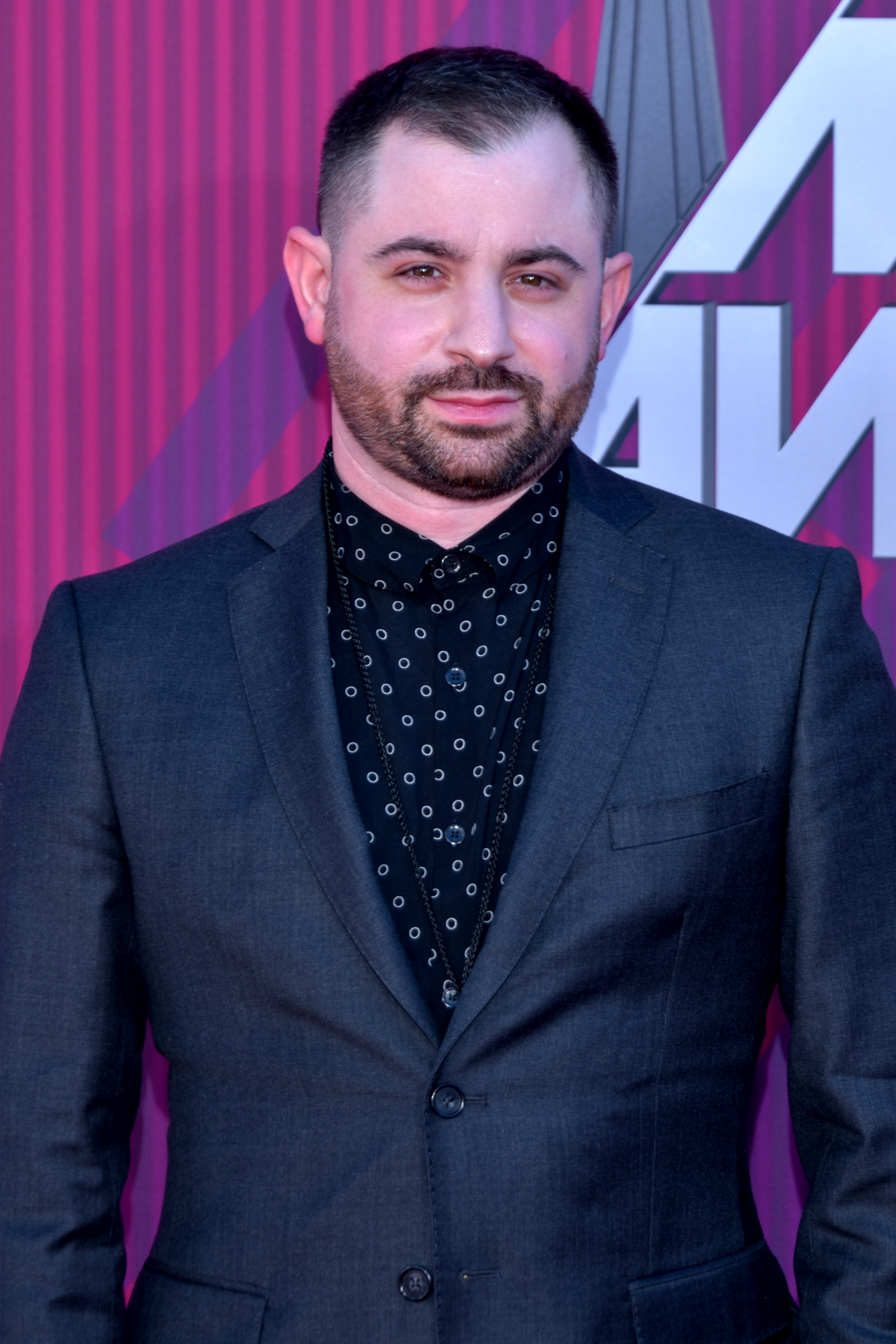
Louis Bell, vocal produced "Crown," "Havana," "She Loves Control," "Real Friends," "Inside Out," "My Oh My," "Beautiful," among others, and produced "Cry for Me," and "Easy."

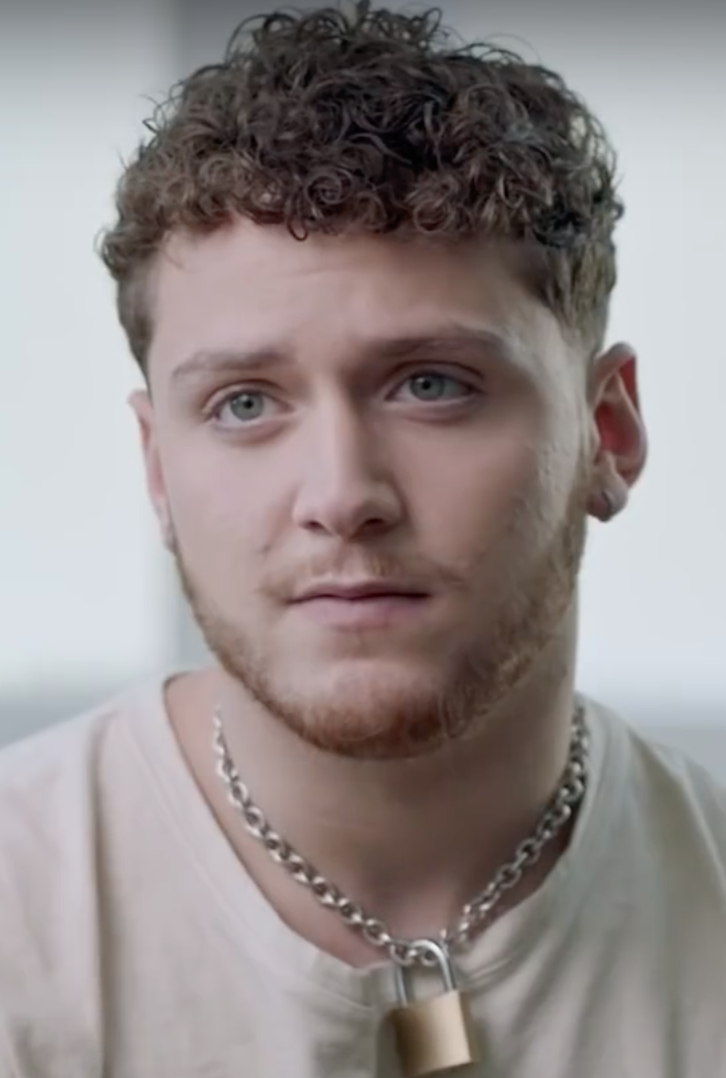
Cabello was featured on the collaboration with American singer-songwriter Bazzi named "Beautiful."

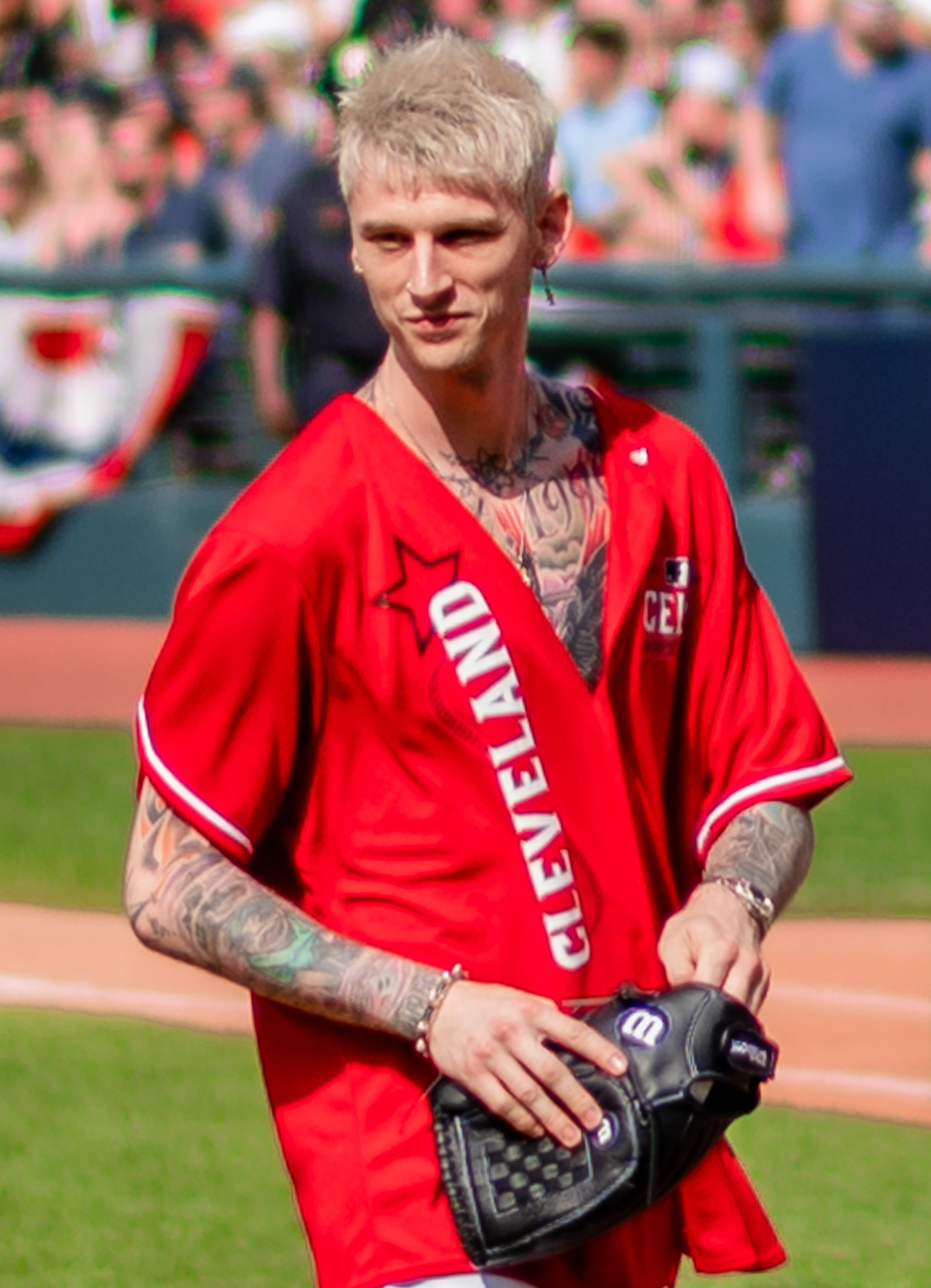
Machine Gun Kelly collaborated with Cabello on her first ever Hot 100 top 5 hit single "Bad Things."

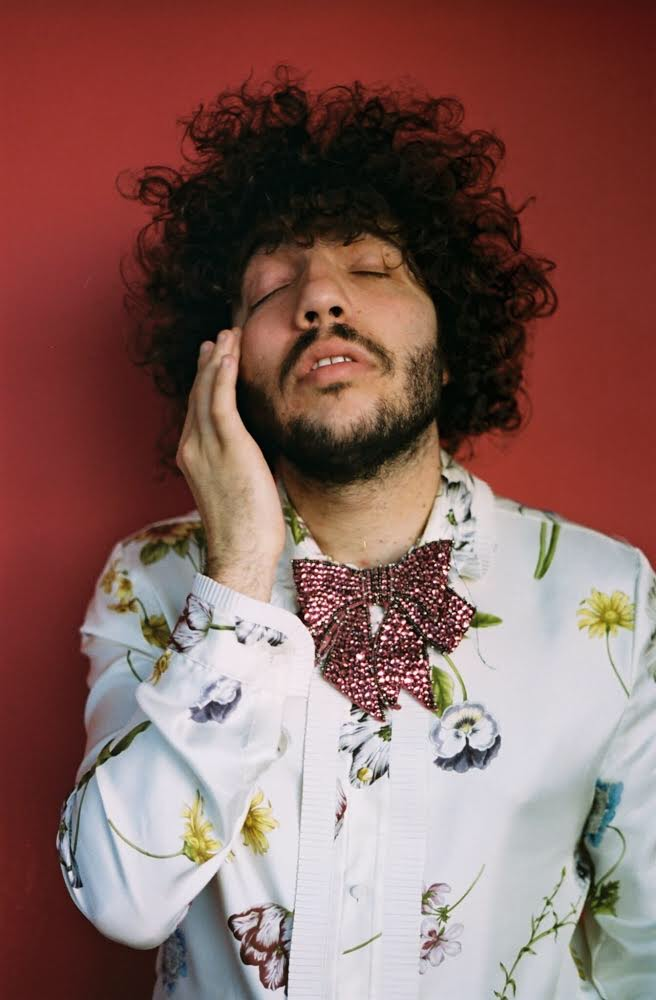
Benny Blanco produced "Crying in the Club," and "Señorita," and co-wrote "Havana."

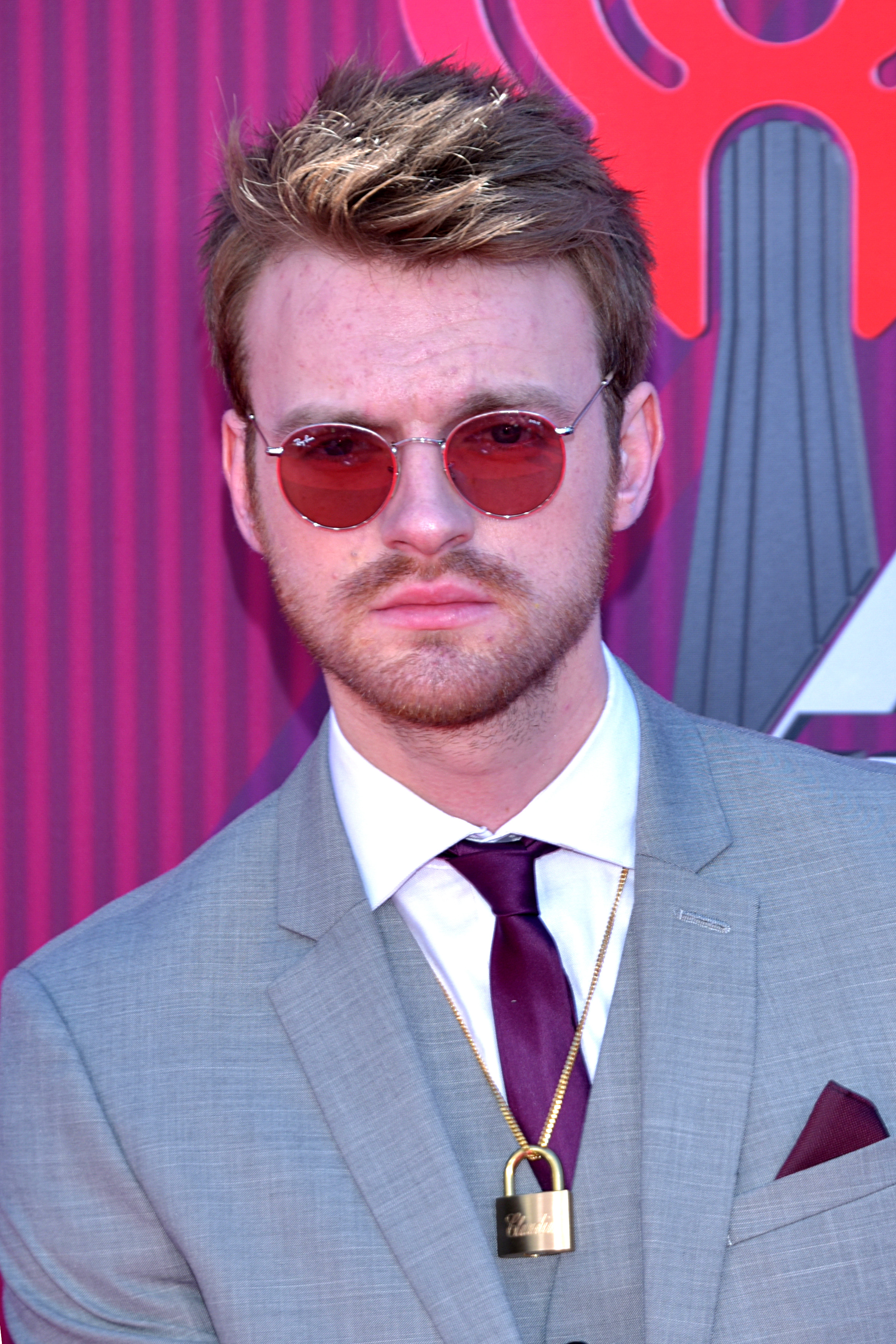
Finneas, one of the producers of Romance.

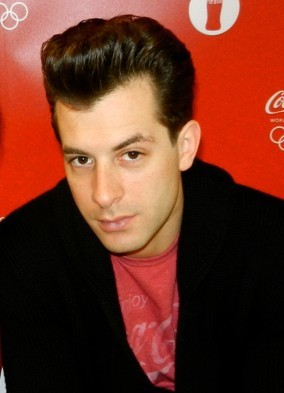
English music producer Mark Ronson collaborated with Cabello on the single "Find U Again."

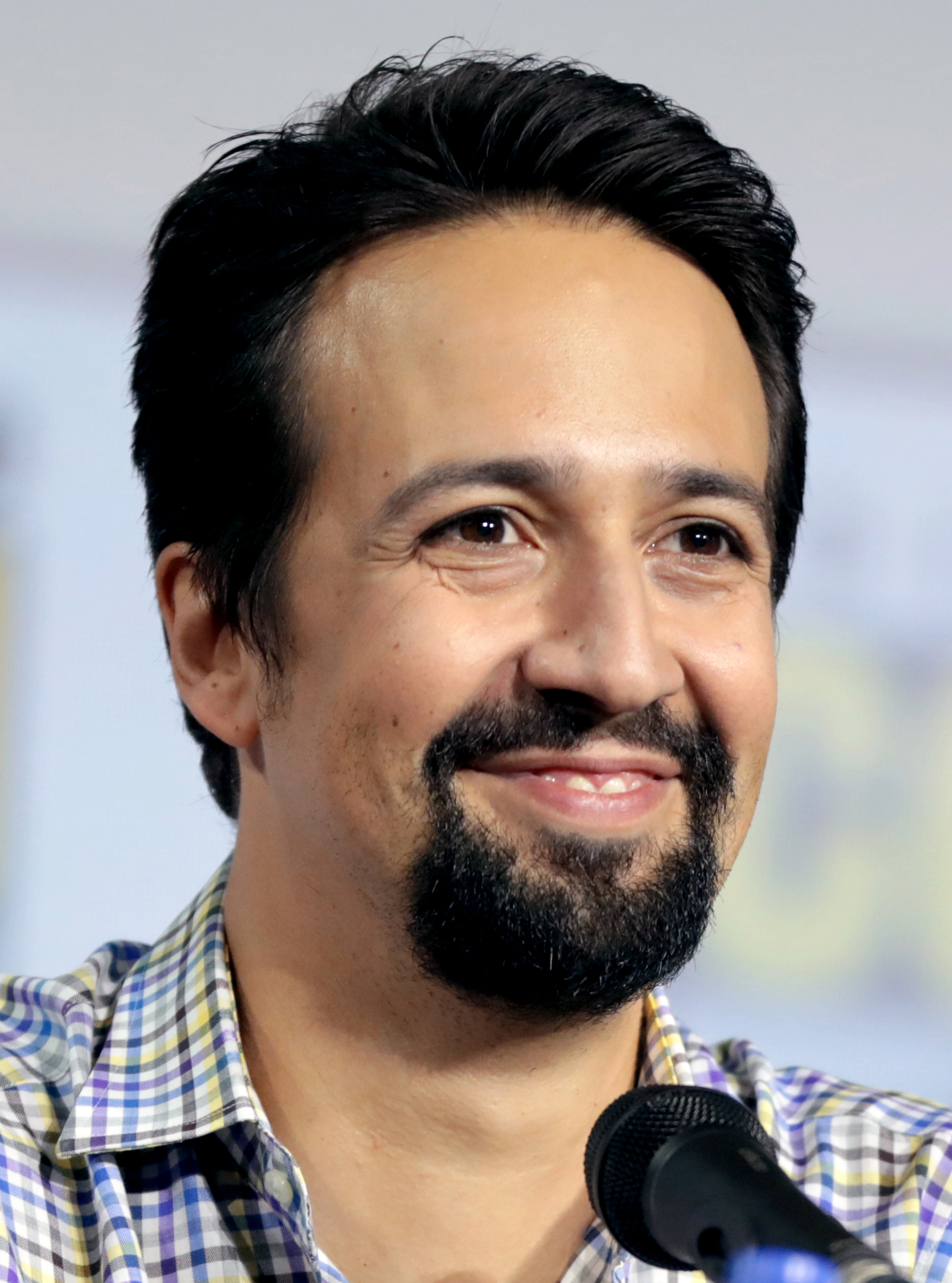
Lin-Manuel Miranda, collaborated with Cabello on "Almost Like Praying."

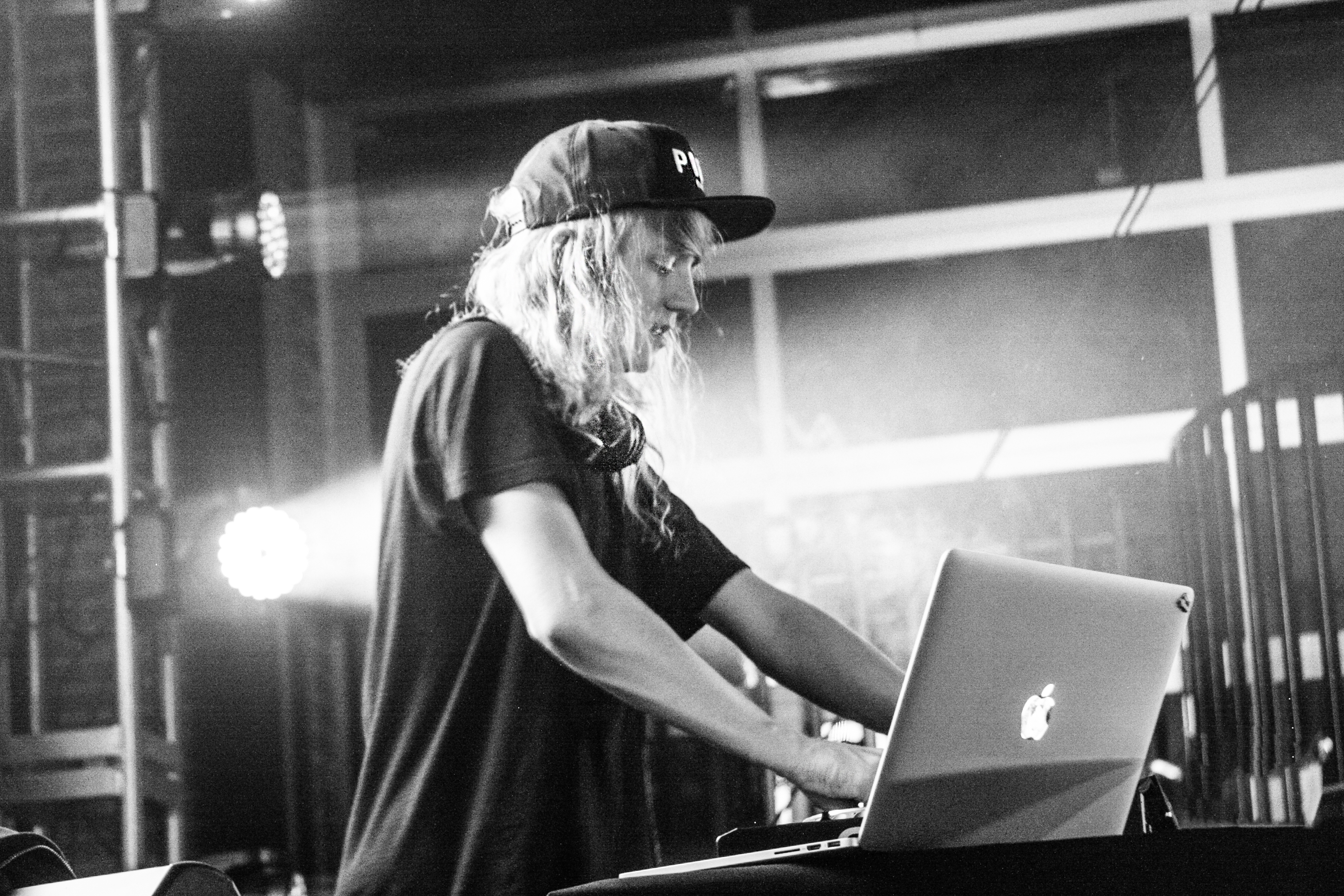
Cashmere Cat, collaborated with Cabello on "Love Incredible," "Crying in the Club," and "Señorita."

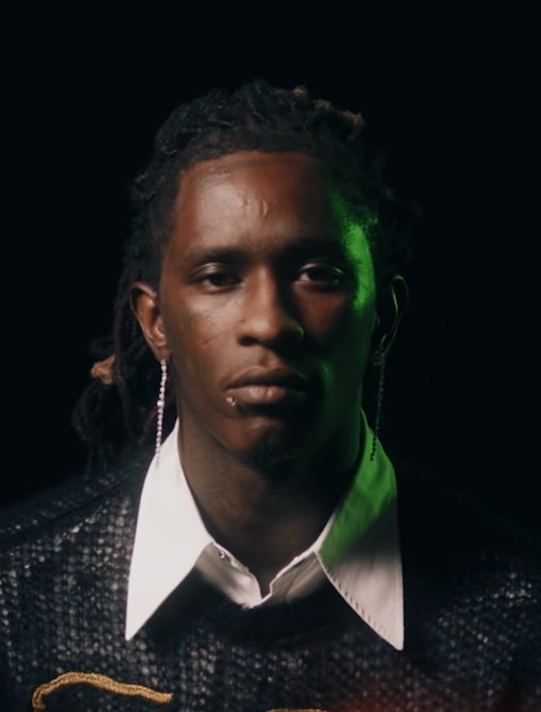
Young Thug is the only featured artist on the standard edition of Cabello's debut solo album Camila.

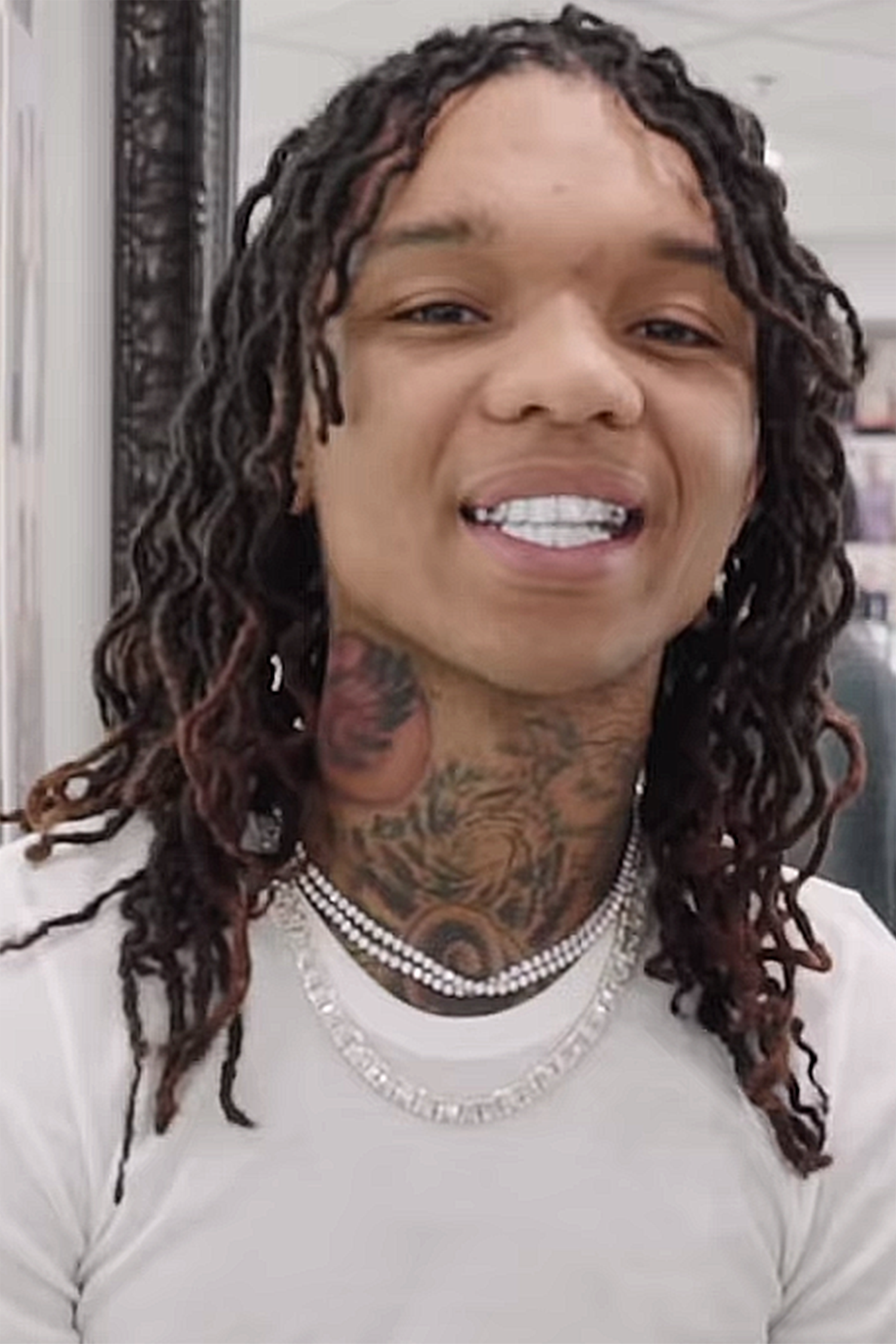
Rapper Swae Lee is featured in the reimagined version of "Real Friends".

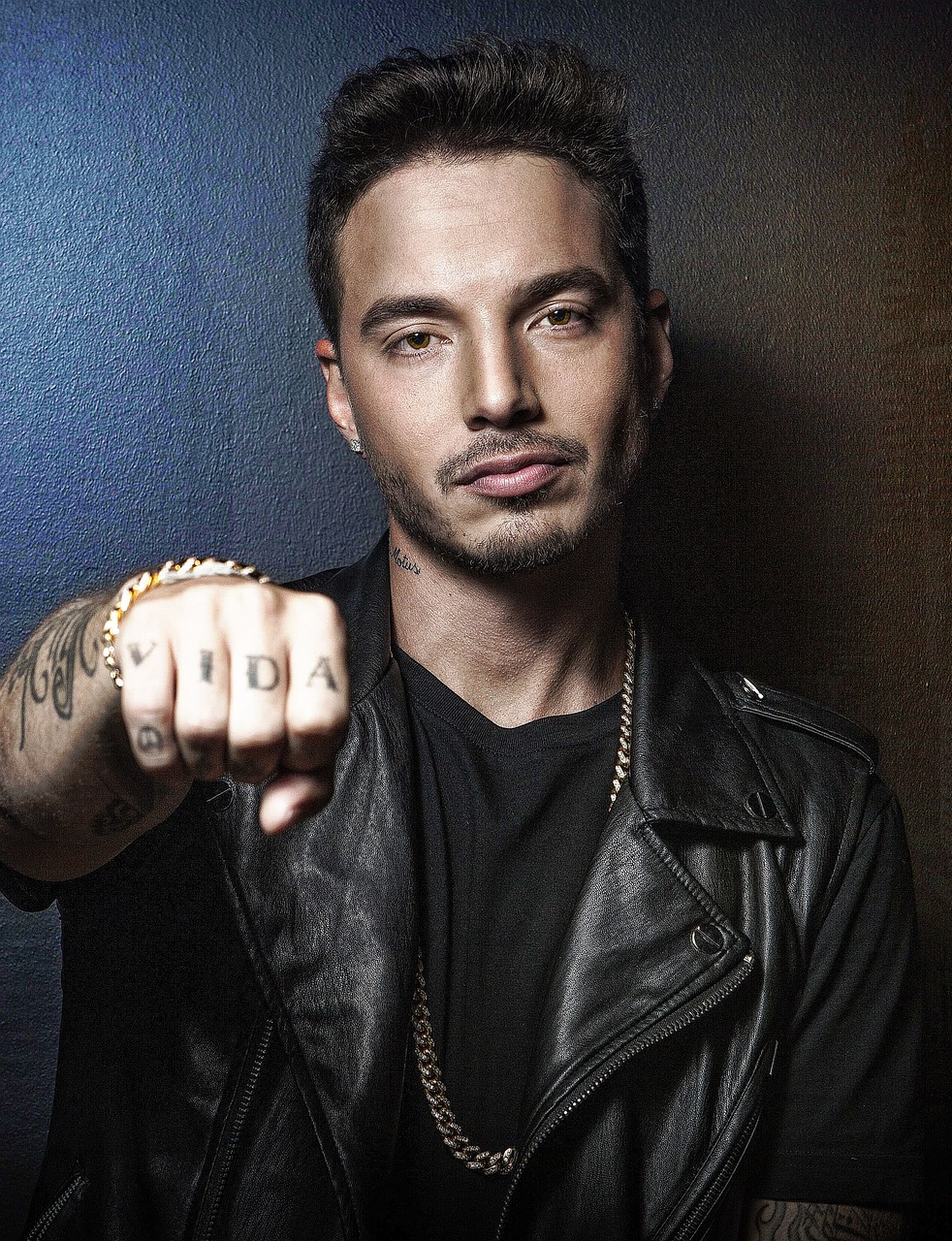
J Balvin collaborated with Cabello on The Fate of the Furious soundtrack single "Hey Ma" with Pitbull, and on an unreleased demo of "Sangria Wine" with Pharrell, Maluma and Young Thug.

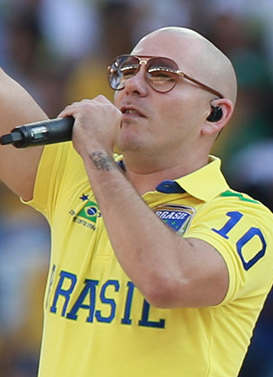
Pitbull collaborated with Cabello on The Fate of the Furious soundtrack single "Hey Ma" with J Balvin.

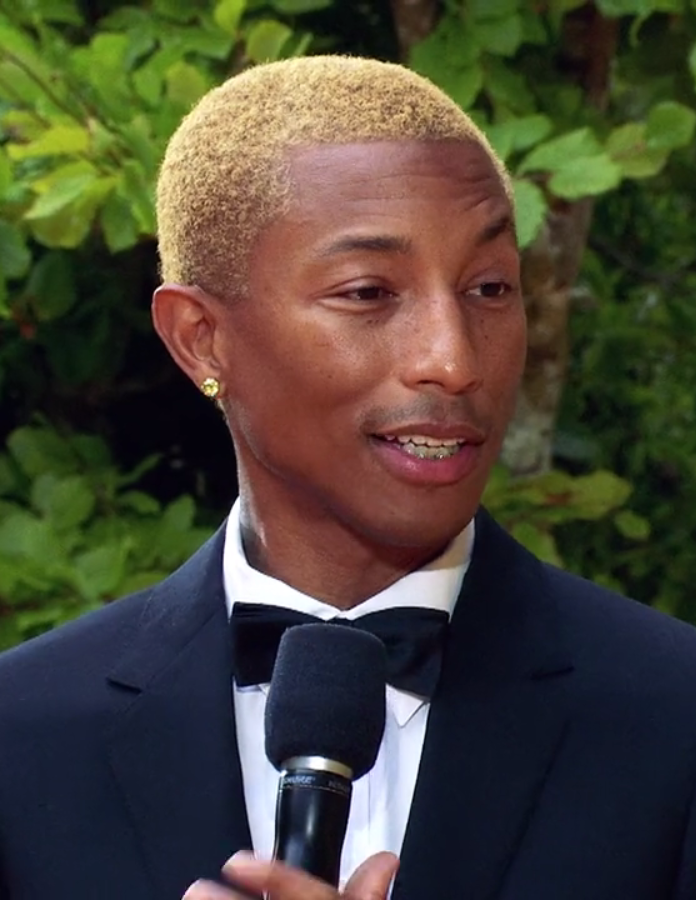
Pharrell collaborated with Cabello on "Sangria Wine" and contributed background vocals for "Havana."

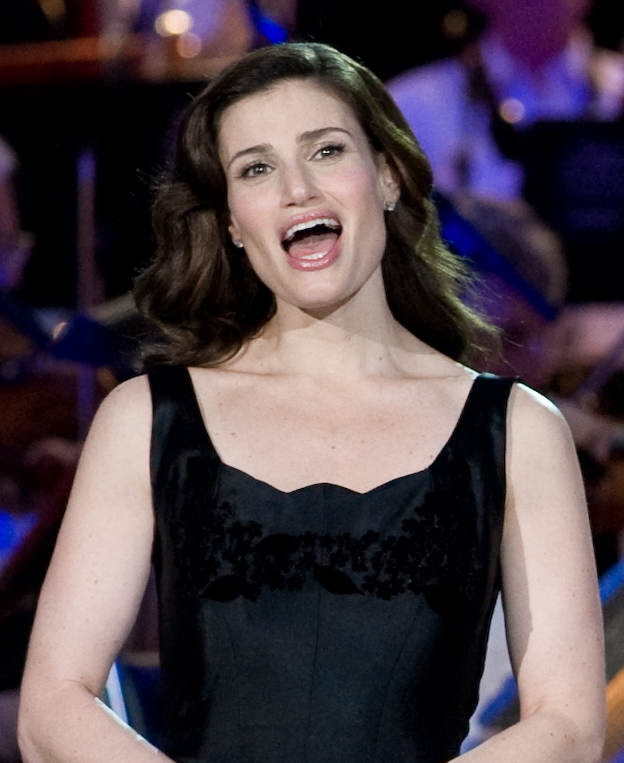
Idina Menzel collaborated with Cabello on the cover recordings for the soundtrack Cinderella.

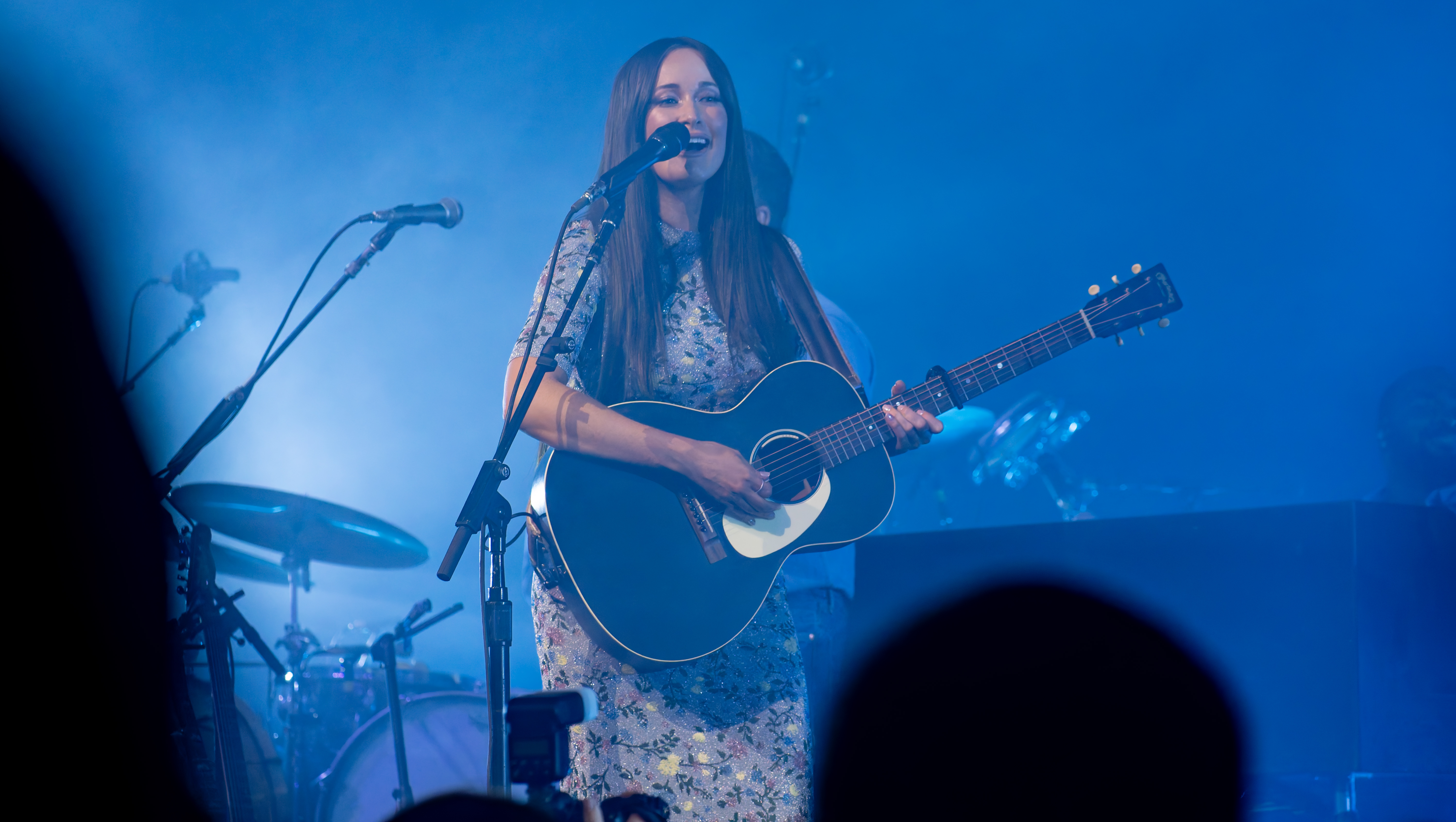
Country singer Kacey Musgraves covered and performed the Christmas song "Rockin' Around the Christmas Tree" with Cabello for her album and television special The Kacey Musgraves Christmas Show".

Key
†	Indicates a cover of another artist's previous work
#	Indicates a remix of another artist's previous work

List of songs, showing featured performers, writers, originating album, and year released
Song	Artist(s)	Writer(s)	Album	Year	Ref.
"All These Years"	Camila Cabello	Camila Cabello; Adam Feeney; Kaan Güneşberk; Jeff Gitelman; Mustafa Ahmed	Camila	2018	
"Almost like Praying"	Lin-Manuel Miranda featuring Artists for Puerto Rico (Note: Composed of Cabello, Gloria Estefan, Jennifer Lopez, Luis Fonsi, Fat Joe, Marc Anthony, Rubén Blades, Pedro Capó, Dessa, Juan Luis Guerra, Alex Lacamoire, John Leguizamo, Rita Moreno, Ednita Nazario, Joell Ortiz, Anthony Ramos, Gina Rodriguez, Gilberto Santa Rosa, PJ Sin Suela, Ana Villafañe and Tommy Torres.)	Lin-Manuel Miranda	—N/a	2017	
"Am I Wrong" †	Camila Cabello, Nicholas Galitzine, Idina Menzel, Cinderella Original Motion Picture Cast	William Larsen; Vincent Dery; Abdoulie Jallow; Nicolay Sereba	Cinderella	2021	
"Bad Things"	Camila Cabello and Machine Gun Kelly	Camila Cabello; Colson Baker; Madison Love; Tony Scalzo; Joe Khajadourian; Alex Schwartz	Bloom	2016	
"Bad Kind of Butterflies"	Camila Cabello	Camila Cabello; Philip Constable; Alexandra Tamposi; Lindsay Gilbert; Crystal Nicole; Jordan K. Johnson; Stefan Johnson; Oliver Peterhof	Romance	2019	
"Beautiful" #	Bazzi featuring Camila Cabello	Andrew Bazzi; Camila Cabello; Kevin Edward Brewster White; Michael Clinton Woods	—N/a	2018	
"Beautiful Day" (Finneas Remix) †# (Note: U2 cover)	Camila Cabello, Finneas, Chris Martin, Khalid, Tove Lo, Ty Dolla $ign, Cynthia Erivo, Leon Bridges, Noah Cyrus and Ben Platt	Bono; Adam Clayton; Larry Mullen Jr. The Edge	—N/a	2020	
"Chanel No. 5"	Camila Cabello	Camila Cabello; Dashawn Moore; Nayvadius Wilburn; Joshua Luellen; Pablo Díaz-Reixa; Jasper Harris	C,XOXO	2024	
"Consequences"	Camila Cabello	Camila Cabello; Amy Wadge; Nicolle Galyon; Emily Weisband	Camila	2018	
"Crown"	Camila Cabello and Grey	Camila Cabello; Kyle Trewartha; Michael Trewartha; Sarah Aarons	Bright: The Album	2017	
"Cry for Me"	Camila Cabello	Camila Cabello; Ryan Tedder; Adam Feeney; Louis Bell	Romance	2019	
"Crying in the Club"	Camila Cabello	Camila Cabello; Benjamin Levin; Nathan Pérez; Sia Furler; David Frank; Steve Kipner; Pamela Sheyne	—N/a	2017	
"Don't Go Yet"	Camila Cabello	Camila Cabello; Scott Harris; Mike Sabath; Eric Frederic	Familia	2021	
"Dream of You"	Camila Cabello	Camila Cabello; Mattias Larsson; Robin Fredriksson; Justin Tranter	Romance	2019	
"Easy"	Camila Cabello	Camila Cabello; Justin Tranter; John Hill; Adam Feeney; Louis Bell; Carter Lang; Westen Weiss	Romance	2019	
"Feel It Twice"	Camila Cabello	Camila Cabello; Louis Bell; Adam Feeney; Tommy Paxton Beesley; Matthew Tavares	Romance	2019	
"Find U Again"	Mark Ronson featuring Camila Cabello	Mark Ronson; Camila Cabello; Kevin Parker; Ilsey Juber	Late Night Feelings	2019	
"First Man"	Camila Cabello	Camila Cabello; Jordan Reynolds; Amy Wadge	Romance	2019	
"Havana" (Note: A remix of "Havana" by Daddy Yankee was released on November 12, 2017, and appears on the Japanese version of the album Camila. A live version of "Havana" was released on September 21, 2018.)	Camila Cabello featuring Young Thug	Camila Cabello; Jeffery Williams; Adam Feeney; Brittany Hazzard; Ali Tamposi; Brian Lee	Camila	2017	
"Hey Ma"	Pitbull and J Balvin featuring Camila Cabello	Armando Pérez; José Balvin; Camila Cabello; Jamie Sanderson; Tinashe Sibanda; Pip Kembo; Johnny Mitchell; Rosina Russel; Johnny Yukon	The Fate of the Furious: The Album	2017	
"I Have Questions"	Camila Cabello	Camila Cabello; Jesse Shatkin; Bibi Bourelly	Camila (Japanese edition)	2017	
"I Know What You Did Last Summer"	Camila Cabello and Shawn Mendes	Camila Cabello; Shawn Mendes; Ido Zmishlany; Noel Zancanella; Bill Withers	Handwritten Revisited	2015	
"I Luv It"	Camila Cabello featuring Playboi Carti	Camila Cabello; Jordan Carter; Pablo Díaz-Reixa; Jasper Harris; Howard Kaylan; Mark Volman; Tarik Adolemiui; Radric Davis; Shondrae Crawford	C,XOXO	2024	
"Inside Out"	Camila Cabello	Camila Cabello; Brittany Hazzard; Adam Feeney; Tyler Williams; Kaan Güneşberk	Camila	2018	
"In the Dark"	Camila Cabello	Camila Cabello; Adam Feeney; Te Whiti Warbrick; Simon Wilcox; Madison Love; James Abrahart	Camila	2018	
"Into It"	Camila Cabello	Camila Cabello; Adam Feeney; Louis Bell; Kaan Güneşberk; Ryan Tedder; Justin Tranter	Camila	2018	
"June Gloom"	Camila Cabello	Camila Cabello; Pablo Díaz-Reixa; Jasper Harris; Michael Mulé; Isaac de Boni	C,XOXO	2024	
"Know No Better"	Major Lazer featuring Travis Scott, Camila Cabello and Quavo	Camila Cabello; Brittany Hazzard; Henry Allen; Jacques Webster II; Quavious Marshall; Thomas Pentz	Know No Better	2017	
"Let's Get Loud" (Note: Jennifer Lopez cover) †	Camila Cabello, Nicholas Galitzine, Idina Menzel and Cinderella Original Motion Picture Cast	Gloria Estefan; Flavio Santander	Cinderella	2021	
"Liar"	Camila Cabello	Camila Cabello; Andrew Wotman; Alexandra Tamposi; Stefan Johnson; Jordan K. Johnson; Jon Bellion; Jenny Berggren; Jonas Berggren; Malin Berggren; Ulf Ekberg; Lionel Richie	Romance	2019	
"Living Proof"	Camila Cabello	Camila Cabello; Alexandra Tamposi; Justin Tranter; Mattias Larsson; Robin Fredriksson	Romance	2019	
"Love Incredible"	Cashmere Cat featuring Camila Cabello	Mangus Høiberg; Benjamin Levin; Sophie Xeon; Camila Cabello	9	2017	
"Million to One"	Camila Cabello	Camila Cabello; Scott Harris	Cinderella	2021	
"Million to One (Reprise)"	Camila Cabello	Camila Cabello; Scott Harris	Cinderella	2021	
"Million to One / Could Have Been Me (Reprise)" (Note: The Struts cover) †	Camila Cabello and Nicholas Galitzine	Camila Cabello; Scott Harris; Rick Parkhouse; Adam Slack; Luke Spiller; George Tizzard; Joshua Wilkinson	Cinderella	2021	
"Mi Persona Favorita"	Camila Cabello and Alejandro Sanz	Camila Cabello; Alejandro Sanz	El Disco	2019	
"My Oh My" (Note: A remix of "My Oh My" featuring DaBaby and Gunna was released on May 1, 2020.)	Camila Cabello featuring DaBaby	Camila Cabello; Jonathan Kirk; Louis Bell; Adam Feeney; Savan Kotecha; Anthony Clemons Jr. Alejandro Marambio	Romance	2019	
"Never Be the Same" (Note: A duet version of "Never Be the Same" featuring Kane Brown was released on April 27, 2018.)	Camila Cabello	Camila Cabello; Adam Feeney; Leo Rami Dawod; Jacob Ludwig Olofsson; Noonie Bao; Sasha Yatchenko	Camila	2017	
"OMG"	Camila Cabello featuring Quavo	Camila Cabello; Charlotte Emma Aitchison; Quavious Marshall; Noonie Bao; Sasha Sloan; Tor Erik Hermansen; Mikkel Storleer Eriksen	—N/a	2017	
"Perfect"	Camila Cabello and Nicholas Galitzine	Ed Sheeran	Cinderella	2021	
"Real Friends" (Note: A reimagined version of "Real Friends" by Swae Lee was released on August 16, 2018.)	Camila Cabello	Camila Cabello; Adam Feeney; William Walsh; Louis Bell; Brian Lee	Camila	2017	
"Rhythm Nation / You Gotta Be" (Note: Mashup cover of Janet Jackson and Des'ree) †	Camila Cabello, Idina Menzel and Cinderella Original Motion Picture Cast	Janet Jackson; James Harris III; Terry Lewis; Desirée Weekes; Ashley Ingram	Cinderella	2021	
"Rockin' Around the Christmas Tree"	Kacey Musgraves featuring Camila Cabello	Johnny Marks	The Kacey Musgraves Christmas Show	2019	
"Sangria Wine"	Camila Cabello and Pharrell Williams	Camila Cabello; Pharrell Williams; Bianca Landrau	—N/a	2018	
"Señorita"	Camila Cabello and Shawn Mendes	Camila Cabello; Shawn Mendes; Andrew Wotman; Benjamin Levin; Alexandra Tamposi; Charlotte Emma Aitchison; Jack Patterson; Magnus August Høiberg	Romance and Shawn Mendes	2019	
"Shameless"	Camila Cabello	Camila Cabello; Andrew Wotman; Alexandra Tamposi; Stefan Johnson; Jordan K. Johnson; Jon Bellion	Romance	2019	
"She Loves Control"	Camila Cabello	Camila Cabello; Skrillex; Adam Feeney; Louis Bell; Ilsey Juber; Mustafa Ahmed	Camila	2018	
"Should've Said It"	Camila Cabello	Camila Cabello; Louis Bell; Adam Feeney; Nate Mercereau; Eric Frederic; Andrew Wotman; Alexandra Tamposi	Romance	2019	
"Something's Gotta Give"	Camila Cabello	Camila Cabello; Alex Schwartz; Joe Khajadourian; Sarah Hudson; James Abrahart; Jesse Saint John	Camila	2018	
"South of the Border" (Note: An acoustic version of "South of the Border" by Ed Sheeran featuring Cabello was released on November 29, 2019.)	Ed Sheeran featuring Camila Cabello and Cardi B	Ed Sheeran; Camila Cabello; Belcalis Almanzar; Fred Gibson; Jordan Thorpe; Steve Mac	No.6 Collaborations Project	2019	
"The Christmas Song" †	Camila Cabello and Shawn Mendes	Robert Wells; Mel Tormé	Wonder	2020	
"This Love"	Camila Cabello	Camila Cabello; Sam Roman; Dayyon Alexander Drinkard; Jeff Shum	Romance	2019	
"Used to This"	Camila Cabello	Camila Cabello; Finneas O'Connell; Amy Wadge	Romance	2019	
"What a Wonderful World" †	Camila Cabello and Shawn Mendes	Bob Thiele; George David Weiss	One World: Together At Home	2020	

== Unreleased songs ==
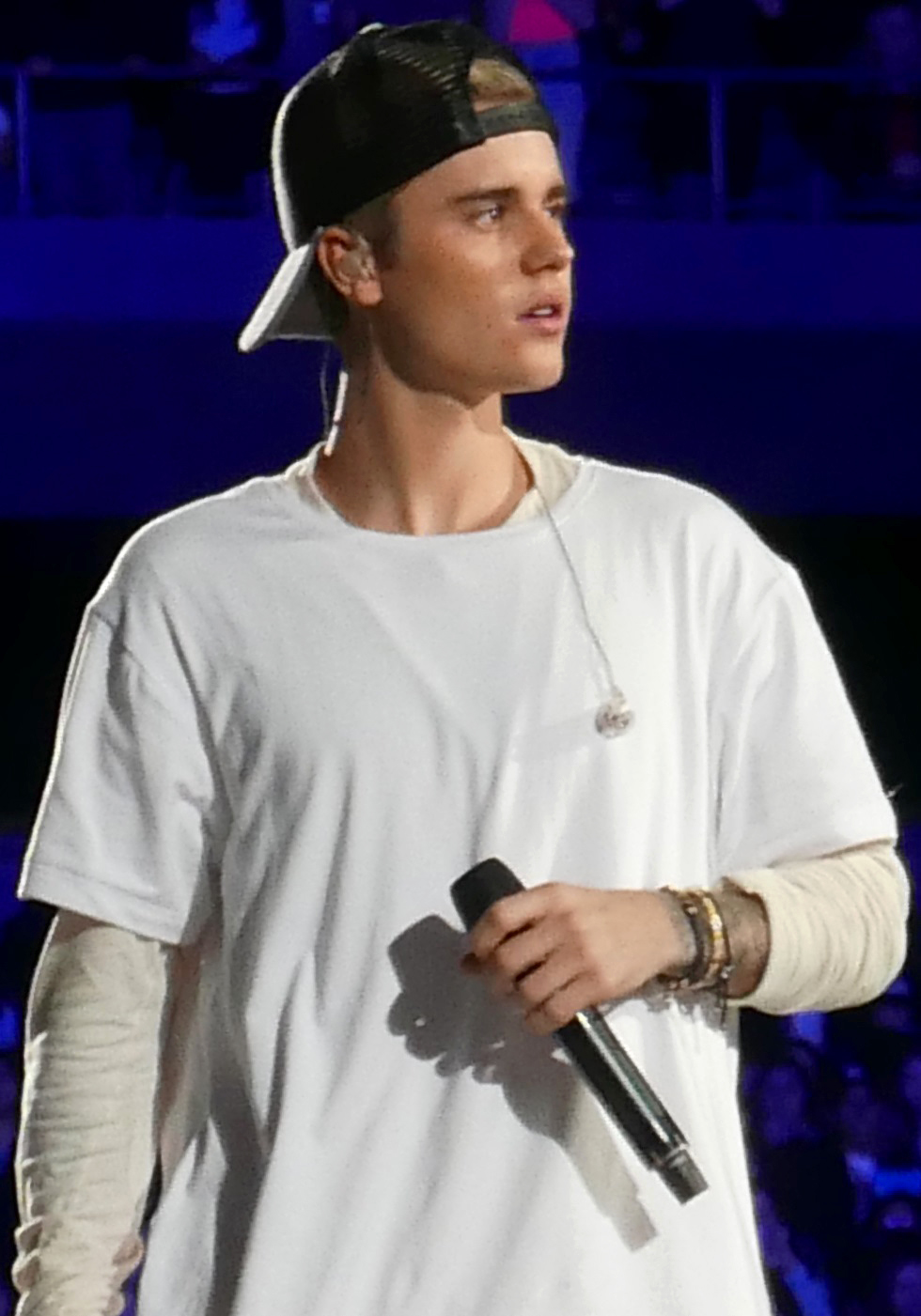
Justin Bieber co-wrote and recorded "Anyone."

List of unreleased songs showing notes about them
Song	Notes	Ref.
"Anyone"	Intended for Romance (2019); Appeared on the Romance track list printed on the target exclusive softpack version bonus poster; Later recorded by Justin Bieber on April 10, 2020, and released on January 1, 2021, as the third single from his studio album Justice	
"Must Be Love"	Intended for Camila (2018); Appeared on the Camila track list on "Consequences" vertical video; Written by Cabello, Louis Bell, Adam Feeney, and Sasha Sloan	
"Scar Tissue"	Intended for Camila (2018); Performed on Never Be the Same Tour; Appeared on the Camila track list on "Consequences" vertical video; Written by Cabello, Charlotte Emma Aitchison, Jonathan Adam Mills, Dacoury Dahi Natche, and Eyelar Mirzazadeh	
"The Boy"	Intended for Camila (2018); Written by Ed Sheeran; On January 22, 2018, Cabello sang the pre-chorus of the track in an interview with Billboard; The full track leaked online in February 2021	

== See also ==
- Camila Cabello discography
