= Liar (Camila Cabello song) =

2019 single by Camila Cabello

Single by Camila Cabello

from the album Romance
- Released: September 5, 2019
- Studio: Gold Tooth Music (Beverly Hills, California); SARM (London, England)
- Genre: Pop
- Length: 3:27
- Label: Epic; Syco
- Songwriters: Camila Cabello; Alexandra Tamposi; Andrew Wotman; Jonathan Bellion; Jordan Johnson; Stefan Johnson; Jenny Berggren; Jonas Berggren; Malin Berggren; Ulf Ekberg; Lionel Richie
- Producers: Andrew Watt; The Monsters and the Strangerz

Camila Cabello singles chronology
"South of the Border" (2019)	"Liar" and "Shameless" (2019)	"Living Proof" (2019)

Music video
- "Liar" on YouTube

"Liar" is a song by American singer and songwriter Camila Cabello from her second studio album Romance (2019). It was released alongside "Shameless" on September 5, 2019, as a double lead single from the album. The song was written by Cabello, Ali Tamposi, Andrew Watt, Jon Bellion, Jordan Johnson, Stefan Johnson, Lionel Richie, Jenny Berggren, Jonas Berggren, Malin Berggren, and Ulf Ekberg. Production was handled by Watt, The Monsters & Strangerz and Bellion.

"Liar" consists of trumpets, bass drums and horns, and contains samples of Richie's 1983 song "All Night Long (All Night)" and Ace of Base's 1992 song "All That She Wants". The lyrics depict Cabello's rekindled emotions for a former partner. It peaked at number 21 on the UK Singles Chart, number 31 on the Australian ARIA Singles Chart, and at number 52 on the US Billboard Hot 100. It was certified platinum in Australia, Brazil, Canada, Norway, Poland, and the United States.

An accompanying music video was directed by Dave Meyers and depicts Cabello trapped inside a time loop sequence. The time loop was compared to Groundhog Day (1993) and Russian Doll (2019), while the music video itself was compared to Inception (2010). Cabello performed the song at several televised events.

== Release ==
From August 31 to September 1, 2019, Cabello posted several teasers regarding her second project titled Romance (2019) to her social media accounts, which were scheduled to be released on September 6, 2019. The teasers included an image of Cabello seated around pillars signed 'R', a spoken-word video about love, and a clip of a key unlocking her mechanical heart. The first installment for the project was announced on September 3, 2019, as she uploaded a 15-second video of tarots displaying the names of the double singles "Shameless" and "Liar". Cabello explained her decision to release both songs simultaneously in a 2019 interview with Zach Sang, stating that she wanted people to become familiar with the sound of Romance. The senior vice president of Epic Records, Sandra Afloarei acknowledged that the dual promotion of both songs had a positive impact on radio stations and considered it to be "a sign of the times".

== Composition ==
Musically, "Liar" is a pop song, which contains an "island", reggae, and pan-Caribbean and Spanish mélange influences. It samples Lionel Richie's 1983 song "All Night Long (All Night)" and Ace of Base's 1992 song "All That She Wants", which provides a jazz element to the song. "Liar" opens with a combination of trumpets, dance-based bass drums, and mariachi-inspired horns. Elements of Latin trap and flamenco are accompanied by electronic handclaps, which leads to the ska-pop chorus. It rapidly cycles through styles of "salsa, reggaetón, flamenco, ska, [and] ballad[s]".

"Liar" was written by Cabello, Alexandra Tamposi, Andrew Wotman, Jonathan Bellion, Jordan Johnson, Stefan Johnson, Jenny Berggren, Jonas Berggren, Malin Berggren, Ulf Ekberg and Lionel Richie, and produced by Wotman, The Monsters and the Strangerz and Bellion. According to the sheet music published at Musicnotes.com by Sony/ATV Music Publishing, the song was composed using 4/4 common time in the key of B minor. Cabello's vocal range spans from the low note of F♯_{3} to the high note of F♯_{5}, giving the song a two octave vocal range. Throughout "Liar", Cabello "moans, whispers, and whimpers". The lyrics describe her experience of expressing feelings for a former partner, as she "seductively" claims to be a liar since "their hearts are so intertwined". Jon Pareles of The New York Times stated that Cabello "sings about how a certain kiss makes her lose control", while Rolling Stone writer Brittany Spanos noted that she "fall[s] deeper in love" during the chorus' lyrics, "Oh no, there you go / Making me a liar / Got me begging you for more / Oh no, there I go / Startin' up a fire".

== Critical reception and commercial performance ==
Pareles wrote that "Liar" is a song which "border-hop[s] at the speed of pop". He listed the song at number 20 on his list of "The 54 Best Songs of 2019" and opined that is "a lighthearted plaint about the power of lust" which "work[s] nimbly and globally to hold elusive the pop attention span".

"Liar" debuted at number 56 on the US Billboard Hot 100 chart dated September 21, 2019. It peaked at number 52 on the chart dated November 2, 2019, and received a platinum certification by the Recording Industry Association of America (RIAA) on September 14, 2020, for sales of 1,000,000 equivalent-units. On the UK Singles Chart dated October 18, 2019, the song peaked at number 21 and remained on the chart for 13 weeks.

== Music video ==
=== Background ===
Cabello shared a preview of the music video through social media on September 9, 2019, with a clip of her answering three questions on a polygraph. Cabello additionally stated that it was the "most fun video [she] ever made." The six-minute video was directed by Dave Meyers and released on September 12, 2019. Writing for MTV News, Patrick Hosken considered the music video to be a "mini movie". Cabello portrays several fictional characters, while Euphoria actor Zak Steiner portrays her engaged fiancé and billionaire oil tycoon called Reese Kensington. Keiynan Lonsdale, Nataliz Jimenez, and Chelsea Brea also appear in supporting roles.

=== Synopsis ===
The video's time loop sequence was compared to the film Groundhog Day and streaming TV series Russian Doll, while the overall music video was compared to the film Inception.

Cabello appears miserable while eating at an outdoor restaurant with her fiancé, Reese Kensington, who only sees her as his trophy wife. She is in a love triangle with Kensington, and a restaurant busboy who gives her a note. Cabello exclaims, "I hate this restaurant... and I want a cheeseburger!" before exiting the restaurant, which triggers the revival of previously wilted roses, waiters admitting that the food is 10 percent natural, two men "making out" while dating other women, a bald man removing a toupée, a man showing a sleeve tattoo to his mother, and a breakdancing waiter within 10 seconds. While Cabello reprimands Kensington, she is struck by a falling elephant from the sky. She immediately wakes up and is placed in a time loop, repeating the same scene with Kensington after dying in various accidents which progressively become more surreal; these include choking to death, being run over by a horde of cyclists, and being swarmed by drones. Cabello inadvertently sets alight Kensington's mansion after burning the note given to her by the busboy, and escapes with "frizzed" hair.

Cabello is taken away by the Truth Police to be placed on a polygraph machine while wearing a straitjacket. Kensington questions her by pulling out a necklace and dildo from her purse. Cabello awakes from the nightmare sequence following the polygraph interrogation, which seemingly breaks the time loop as she abandons Kensington for the busboy. A digitally animated bird then flies into the room as three Latina talk show hosts including the main host and Cabello's alter ego La Flaca, and co-anchors Gordita and Tammy, comically criticize Cabello's actions and appearance.

=== Reception ===
Liz Calvario of Entertainment Tonight commented that the music video is "telenovela-inspired" and described it as "fascinating", while Karen Gwee of NME considered it to be "comedic" and "hilariously absurd". Billboard writer Taylor Weatherby praised Cabello's acting skills and described the music video as a "cinematic masterpiece". Writing for Rolling Stone, Althea Legaspi summarized the plot as "Cabello reliving a number of scenes that get progressively more ridiculous and humorous as she tries to escape her conflicting emotions", and noted that the music video contained similarities to the song's lyrics depicting a relationship while constantly denying their own emotions. She also compared the time loop sequence to the 1993 film Groundhog Day. Hosken stated that the "extravagant" music video is similar to the 2019 streaming television series Russian Doll than Groundhog Day, contrasting Natasha Lyonne's "sense of purpose" in the former to Bill Murray's "aimless hedonism" in the latter. He added that the plot is "secondary to the overall experience" which he compared to the "mindfuckery" of the 2010 film Inception, and praised the cinematic scope, which he singled out "the pink shot of Cabello amid a sea of flamingos" as "downright dazzling" and acknowledged that she enjoyed portraying an increasingly unhinged person. Wade Sheridan of United Press International (UPI) additionally compared the time loop sequence to Groundhog Day and Russian Doll.

== Live performances ==
Cabello debuted the live performance of "Liar" at the iHeartRadio Music Festival on September 20, 2019, as the second-last song on her setlist. Katie Atkinson of Billboard opined that the song's horn arrangement suited a live environment, while Hayden Brooks of iHeartRadio considered her performance with the backup dancers to have high energy. Cabello performed the song at the Fillmore Miami Beach in a private concert hosted by Verizon Up on September 25, 2019. Cabello wore a white catsuit covered in bandages with white heels and "long curly locks", as she performed with a hip-swaying dance while clouds appeared on the screen's background. On October 2, 2019, she appeared on BBC Radio 1's Live Lounge segment to perform "Liar" and a cover of Lewis Capaldi's 2018 song "Someone You Loved". Cabello performed the song on The Graham Norton Show dated October 25, 2019, where she embraced Emilia Clarke following the performance. Cabello performed "Liar" at the iHeartRadio Jingle Ball in New York City on December 13, 2019, while wearing a pearl corset with latex pants. During her virtual concert series titled 'Priceless Experiences at Home' which was released on July 15, 2020, Cabello performed "Liar" in a piano medley with "Señorita" and "My Oh My" by incorporating several vocal layers.

Throughout the Born Pink World Tour by South Korean girl group Blackpink, member Jisoo performed a solo cover of "Liar" while sporting a red outfit, which was positively received by Cabello. During their tour at the Banc of California Stadium in Los Angeles on November 19, 2022, Jisoo performed the song with Cabello, with the latter appearing in customized Blackpink-branded attire.

== Track listings ==
Digital download
No.	Title	Length
1.	"Liar"	3:28

Digital download – live version
No.	Title	Length
1.	"Liar" (Live)	3:06

== Credits and personnel ==
Credits adapted from the liner notes of Romance.

Recording

- Recorded at Gold Tooth Music (Beverly Hills, California) and SARM Studios (London, England)
- Mixed at MixStar Studios (Virginia Beach, Virginia)
- Mastered at the Mastering Palace (New York City, New York)

Personnel

- Camila Cabello – vocals, songwriting
- The Monsters and the Strangerz – production, keyboards
- Andrew Watt – production, songwriting, guitar, keyboards
- Jon Bellion – miscellaneous production, songwriting
- Alexandra Tamposi – songwriting
- Jordan Johnson – songwriting
- Stefan Johnson – songwriting
- Jenny Berggren – songwriting
- Jonas Berggren – songwriting
- Malin Berggren – songwriting
- Ulf Ekberg – songwriting
- Lionel Richie – songwriting
- John Hanes – mixing
- Serban Ghenea – mixing
- Paul Lamalfa – recording
- Dave Kutch – mastering

Sample credits

- "Liar" contains a sample of "All Night Long (All Night)" (1983) performed and written by Lionel Richie, and "All That She Wants" (1992) performed by Ace of Base and written by members Ulf Ekberg, Malin Berggren, Jenny Berggren and Jonas Berggren.

== Charts ==
=== Weekly charts ===
Weekly chart performance for "Liar"
Chart (2019–2020)	Peak position
Argentina Hot 100 (Billboard)	71
Australia (ARIA)	31
Austria (Ö3 Austria Top 40)	50
Belgium (Ultratop 50 Flanders)	28
Belgium (Ultratop 50 Wallonia)	12
Bulgaria (PROPHON)	4
Canada Hot 100 (Billboard)	27
Canada AC (Billboard)	25
Canada CHR/Top 40 (Billboard)	17
Canada Hot AC (Billboard)	22
ERROR in "CIS": Invalid position: 260. Expected number 1–200 or dash (–).
Croatia (HRT)	12
Czech Republic Singles Digital (ČNS IFPI)	31
Estonia (Eesti Tipp-40)	20
Euro Digital Song Sales (Billboard)	18
Finland (Radiosoittolista)	25
France (SNEP)	122
Germany (GfK)	63
Greece (IFPI)	12
Hungary (Rádiós Top 40)	12
Hungary (Single Top 40)	21
Hungary (Stream Top 40)	15
Iceland (Tónlistinn)	15
Ireland (IRMA)	17
Israel (Media Forest)	7
Japan Hot 100 (Billboard)	89
Latvia (LAIPA)	18
Lithuania (AGATA)	10
Malaysia (RIM)	20
Mexico (Billboard Mexican Airplay)	24
Netherlands (Dutch Top 40)	6
Netherlands (Single Top 100)	12
New Zealand (Recorded Music NZ)	32
Norway (VG-lista)	23
Poland Airplay (ZPAV)	1
Portugal (AFP)	53
Romania (Airplay 100)	35
San Marino (SMRRTV Top 50)	36
Scottish Singles Sales (Official Charts)	18
Singapore (RIAS)	13
Slovakia Airplay (ČNS IFPI)	22
Slovakia Singles Digital (ČNS IFPI)	18
Slovenia (SloTop50)	9
Spain (Promusicae)	92
Sweden (Sverigetopplistan)	58
Switzerland (Schweizer Hitparade)	42
UK Singles (Official Charts)	21
US Billboard Hot 100	52
US Adult Pop Airplay (Billboard)	18
US Pop Airplay (Billboard)	17
US Dance Airplay (Billboard)	29
US Rolling Stone Top 100	49
Venezuela Anglo (Record Report)	6
Venezuela Pop (Record Report)	21

=== Year-end charts ===
Year-end chart performance for "Liar" in 2019
Chart (2019)	Position
Hungary (Stream Top 40)	52
Latvia (LAIPA)	92
Netherlands (Dutch Top 40)	30
Netherlands (Single Top 100)	68
Poland (Polish Airplay Top 100)	50
Tokyo (Tokio Hot 100)	75

Year-end chart performance for "Liar" in 2020
Chart (2020)	Position
Belgium (Ultratop Wallonia)	65
Hungary (Rádiós Top 40)	56
Poland (Polish Airplay Top 100)	57

== Certifications ==
Certifications and sales for "Liar"
Region	Certification	Certified units/sales
Australia (ARIA)	Platinum	70,000^{‡}
Austria (IFPI Austria)	Gold	15,000^{‡}
Brazil (Pro-Música Brasil)	Platinum	40,000^{‡}
Canada (Music Canada)	Platinum	80,000^{‡}
Denmark (IFPI Danmark)	Gold	45,000^{‡}
France (SNEP)	Gold	100,000^{‡}
Italy (FIMI)	Gold	35,000^{‡}
Mexico (AMPROFON)	Gold	30,000^{‡}
New Zealand (RMNZ)	Platinum	30,000^{‡}
Norway (IFPI Norway)	Platinum	60,000^{‡}
Poland (ZPAV)	Platinum	20,000^{‡}
Portugal (AFP)	Gold	5,000^{‡}
Switzerland (IFPI Switzerland)	Gold	10,000^{‡}
United Kingdom (BPI)	Gold	400,000^{‡}
United States (RIAA)	Platinum	1,000,000^{‡}
Streaming
Sweden (GLF)	Gold	4,000,000^{†}
^{‡} Sales+streaming figures based on certification alone.^{†} Streaming-only figures based on certification alone.

== Release history ==
Release dates and formats for "Liar"
Region	Date	Format	Version	Label	Ref.
Various	September 5, 2019	Digital download; streaming	Original	Epic; Syco	
United Kingdom	September 6, 2019	Contemporary hit radio	Original	Epic; Syco	
Australia	September 6, 2019	Contemporary hit radio	Original	Sony	
Italy	September 13, 2019	Contemporary hit radio	Original	Sony	
Various	December 12, 2019	12-inch picture disc	Original	Epic; Syco	
Various	December 20, 2019	Digital download; streaming	Live	Epic; Syco	
Various	February 25, 2020	7-inch vinyl	Original	Epic; Syco	

== See also ==
- List of number-one singles of 2019 (Poland)
- List of number-one singles of 2020 (Poland)
