= Romance (Camila Cabello album) =

2019 studio album by Camila Cabello

Studio album by Camila Cabello
- Released: December 6, 2019
- Recorded: November 2018 – October 2019
- Genre: Pop
- Length: 46:40
- Labels: Epic; Syco
- Producers: Louis Bell; Jon Bellion; Benny Blanco; Cashmere Cat; DJ HardWerk; Frank Dukes; Finneas; German; John Hill; Carter Lang; Mattman & Robin; Nate Mercereau; Jordan Reynolds; Ricky Reed; RØMANS; Rush Hr; Bart Schoudel; Matthew Tavares; The Monsters and the Strangerz; Andrew Watt; Westen Weiss

Camila Cabello chronology
Camila (2018)	Romance (2019)	Familia (2022)

Singles from Romance
- 1. "Shameless" Released: September 5, 2019; 2. "Liar" Released: September 5, 2019; 3. "Living Proof" Released: November 15, 2019; 4. "My Oh My" Released: January 6, 2020; 5. "First Man" Released: June 18, 2020

Romance is the second studio album by American singer Camila Cabello. It was released on December 6, 2019, through Epic Records and Syco Music. The singer recorded the album from November 2018 to October 2019. Featuring guest appearances from DaBaby and Shawn Mendes, it was produced by Frank Dukes, Louis Bell, the Monsters and the Strangerz, John Hill, Andrew Watt, and Finneas, among others. Cabello finished recording Romance on October 31, 2019, and the next day submitted the masters for the album. On November 13, Cabello announced that the album would be released on December 6, 2019. Primarily a pop record, Romance contains R&B, Latin pop, and rock influences.

Romance received generally positive reviews from music critics and debuted at number one in Canada, number three in the US, and in the top ten in several other countries, including Australia, Mexico and New Zealand. To promote the album, Cabello was set to embark on the Romance Tour, starting with Europe and then North America, but the tour was cancelled due to the COVID-19 pandemic. The album was certified platinum by the Recording Industry Association of America (RIAA) in May 2020, for selling one million album-equivalent units in the United States, becoming Cabello's second album to do so, following 2018's Camila.

== Background and recording ==
I've never lived as much life as I did writing this album. It was messy and beautiful, unforgettable and at times so painful I wish I could forget. It was excruciatingly consuming and impossible not to get lost in. It was mine... and now it's yours. I hope you love it as much as I've loved living it.

— Cabello discussing the making of Romance

After the release of Cabello's debut studio album, Camila (2018), American musicians Brian Lee and Louis Bell told MTV News that they were already looking ahead to her next project. Bell said he imagined she would work on her second album during her then-upcoming tour, saying they would send ideas back and forth from April until June, when they would finally be able to get into the studio together. He wanted to give the second album a "more mature progression," but ultimately, the new songs would depend on Cabello. In August 2019, Cabello began teasing new material through social media. She posted a cryptic video, titled "What Do I Know About Love?", in which she delivered a spoken-word monologue which reflects on the complexities of love and heartbreak. In the video, Cabello, who had recently split from her ex-boyfriend Matthew Hussey, mused on questions such as "Where does the love go when it runs out?" and "Why does it die?", while scenes showed her walking along the beach and surrounded by nature. Later in the clip, she stated, "What do I know about love? Everything", and described love as a transformative experience that "will bring you to your knees — if you did it right". Around the same time, she updated her social media profile pictures to an antique-style photo frame, further fueling speculation about her next project. In a September 2019 interview with Zane Lowe, Cabello stated that her upcoming album, Romance, would explore the real emotions and experiences of being in love. She explained that writing from within a relationship gave her music greater depth and detail compared to her earlier work. Cabello also mentioned working with Finneas O'Connell on one of the tracks and said that the album aimed to capture the sincerity of classic love songs while reflecting her personal growth.

On September 1, 2019, Cabello posted a teaser clip on her social media, revealing the name of the album. The first installment was revealed on September 5, alongside the lead singles, "Shameless" and "Liar". In an interview with Zach Sang, Cabello explained that she chose to release the two songs together because they represent "both sides of a story". She said that pairing tracks when launching a new project helps listeners understand its concept more fully. She added that releasing only one single after a long break felt "too much pressure". Cabello described "Shameless" as a song she felt deeply connected to, recalling that its recording came during an "emotional peak" when she "wasn't self-conscious at all". She further noted that the two singles, along with another unreleased song, were the final tracks recorded for Romance, and stated that while the album was essentially complete, she continued writing new material inspired by her experiences.

On October 31, 2019, she announced that the album was completed. Cabello announced the album's release date on November 13, 2019, by posting parts of the album's cover art. On the same day, she also announced the tour. On November 26, 2019, the entire standard edition of the album was leaked on online, just over a week before its release. Cabello revealed the album's track list on November 29, 2019. Romance was released on December 6, 2019, with pre-orders beginning on November 15. The album was recorded in a period of 11 months, between November 2018 and October 31, 2019. Cabello wrote over 80 songs for the album during this period.

== Composition ==
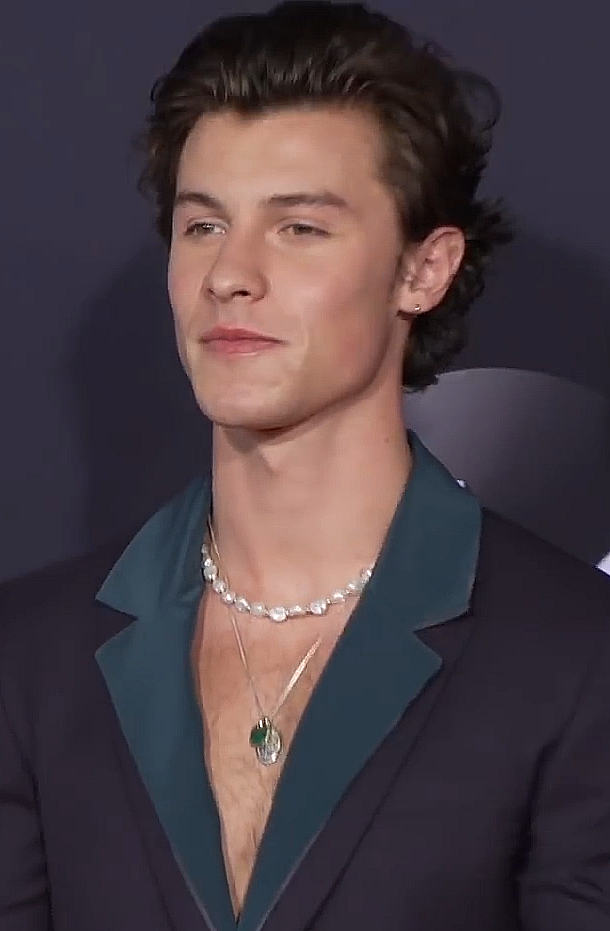
Canadian singer Shawn Mendes, whose relationship with Cabello inspired much of Romance.

Romance is a pop record with influences of R&B, Latin pop and rock. Much of the album was inspired by Cabello's relationship with Canadian singer Shawn Mendes, whom she began dating in July 2019. Lyrically, Cabello described the album as "sounding like what falling in love feels like".

The opening track of the album, "Shameless", is a power pop-punk and pop-rock song about the fear of exploring new love. "Living Proof" is a pop song about Cabello's relationship with her lover, expressed through religious imagery. "Should've Said It" is a latin-pop rock song about a former partner coming back for a second chance at love. "My Oh My" featuring DaBaby is a pop-rap, reggaeton-pop and R&B song. Cabello's collaboration with Mendes, "Señorita", is a latin-pop song about a couple's deep lust for one and other. "Liar" is a latin-pop song with flamenco and latin trap elements and a ska-pop chorus. The song is about romantic feelings taking over ones self. "Bad Kind of Butterflies", a pop song, is about the anxiety that comes with being in love with two people. "Easy" is a song about realizing one's own worth through the experience of a new and effortless love. "Feel It Twice" is a breakup song that reflects on a past relationship, potentially referencing Cabello's former partner Matthew Hussey and the public attention surrounding her relationship with Mendes. "Dream of You" is a ballad about loving somebody no matter what. "Cry for Me" is a pop-rock song about being jealous of an ex-partner. "This Love" is described as an old-school R&B-rock ballad. The song is about an indecisive lover. "Used to This" is about Cabello's first date with Mendes in San Francisco. "First Man" is a pop-rock piano ballad. Cabello wrote the song about her relationship with her dad while she is in a romantic relationship with a "good guy".

== Promotion ==
=== Singles ===
"Señorita", a collaboration with Canadian singer-songwriter Shawn Mendes, was released on June 21, 2019. The song reached number one on the US Billboard Hot 100, as well as topping the charts in a record setting 40 countries worldwide. It is certified multiplatinum in thirteen countries, including Diamond in Australia, Canada, France, and Mexico, as well as double diamond in Poland.

"Shameless" and "Liar" were released simultaneously on September 5, 2019, as the lead and second single from the album, respectively. "Shameless" reached the top 50 in the United Kingdom, Canada, Greece, and Scotland, and peaked at number 60 on Billboard Hot 100. "Liar" was certified platinum on September 14, 2020, by the Recording Industry Association of America (RIAA), and it has peaked at number 52 in the US. Both songs received music videos; the video for "Shameless" accompanied the songs' release, and the video directed by Dave Meyers for "Liar" was released a week later. Cabello performed "Liar" on The Graham Norton Show on October 25, 2019.

On November 15, 2019, Romance was made available for pre-orders alongside the single "Living Proof". The song was promoted with several live performances including at the 2019 American Music Awards, The Tonight Show Starring Jimmy Fallon and The Ellen DeGeneres Show. The song received a music video directed by Alan Ferguson which was released ahead of her American Music Awards performance. "My Oh My", featuring DaBaby, was released as the album's fourth single on January 6, 2020. Cabello and DaBaby performed the song on The Tonight Show Starring Jimmy Fallon on December 12, 2019. It peaked at number 12 on the Billboard Hot 100 and reached number 1 on Billboard Pop Songs Radio Airplay Chart. The Dave Meyers directed music video was released on February 12, 2020. On September 14, 2020, "My Oh My" was certified double platinum by RIAA, and Music Canada in May 2020. The single was certified Diamond in Brazil in October 2021.

"First Man" was released as the fifth and final single from Romance on June 18, 2020. Cabello released the music video on June 21, coinciding with the 2020 Father's Day celebrations. The song was performed live at the 62nd Grammy Awards.

=== Promotional singles ===
"Cry for Me" and "Easy" were released as the first and second promotional singles on October 4 and 11, 2019, respectively. Cabello performed the songs on Saturday Night Live on October 12, 2019. On Billboard's Bubbling Under Hot 100 singles chart, "Easy" peaked at number 10 and "Cry for Me" at number 15. Both songs reached the top 10 in New Zealand.

=== Tour ===
Cabello officially announced the Romance Tour on November 13, 2019. The tour was set to go across North America and Europe starting in May 2020, but was later postponed and then cancelled due to the COVID-19 pandemic.

== Critical reception ==
Professional ratings
Aggregate scores
Source	Rating
AnyDecentMusic?	6.1/10
Metacritic	71/100
Review scores
Source	Rating
AllMusic	4/5 stars
Exclaim!	6/10
The Guardian	2/5 stars
The Independent	4/5 stars
NME	3/5 stars
The Observer	3/5 stars
Pitchfork	6.1/10
Rolling Stone	4/5 stars
The Telegraph	3/5 stars
The Times	3/5 stars

Romance was met with generally positive reviews from critics. At Metacritic, which assigns a normalized rating out of 100 to reviews from mainstream publications, the album received a weighted average score of 71 based on 12 reviews, indicating "generally favorable reviews". The review aggregator site AnyDecentMusic? compiled 10 reviews and gave the album an average of 6.1 out of 10, based on their assessment of the critical consensus.

Matt Collar of AllMusic declared that Romance was about "Cabello feeling loved and seen by someone else" and "just as much about her seeing and understanding herself as an artist", while naming the record "compelling." Variety's Chris Willman opined that the album "bumps her up a level as an artist, without trying to advance her into maturity too fast". He named a majority of the album's tracks as being in "good-to-great range" and that she is "proving more expressive as a singer". The Independent author Adam White considered it a "marked improvement on the pick'n'mix anonymity of her 2018 debut", adding that while not everything works on the record, "there is an obvious through line connecting the majority of its tracks." Kitty Empire of The Observer named the album "giddy, frisky fun but not to the point of nausea". Writing for Rolling Stone, Lucas Villa named Romance "revelatory", while feeling that Cabello deepened her songwriting on it. Will Hodgkinson of The Times called the album "efficient pop that maximises the froth", while Irene Monokandilos of Consequence felt Cabello's "growth [was] on full display" and felt the record was at its best when in "riskier, seedier, quieter territory" but felt that she "plays it safe" and that it is "an album of mostly bark and scant bite". She concluded her review by calling it "a solid, sexually charged sophomore entry that places growth at center-stage and keeps us wanting more without going limp".

In a mixed review, Hannah Mylrea of NME stated that Romance "shines during these more upbeat, fun moments" but "is less successful when Cabello tries to show the side of romance where you're falling head over heels or doubting a relationship". Writing for Pitchfork, Stefanie Fernández noted it "follows the same pristine pop cues" of her debut and "imbues them with a vision about love so universalized it blurs it out of focus"; Fernández felt the album "succeeds in tracks that capture love's fleeting minutiae", but the "inconsistent" production and "overproduced" songs leave "too much space where Cabello is overshadowed". Stereogum's Chris DeVille named Romance "an overall stronger album than Camila", but felt it was "a lot easier to like than to love" and that it was not as "transfixing as the love that inspired it".

Neil McCormick of The Telegraph criticized the reuse of older songs and excessive use of auto-tune in Romance, concluding that it is "state-of-the-art pop yet it lacks the real romance of music made from the heart." The Guardian's Alexis Petridis deemed the songwriting "so-so" and questioned the production, including the "distracting" use of auto-tune "not as a special effect but as a kind of cure-all lotion slathered over every syllable that passes Cabello's lips." Chantel Ouellet of Exclaim! felt the album's "overall overproduction and focus on chasing an earworm makes it impossible to retain the authenticity found on her previous hits" while feeling that it "still relies on a structure that is becoming increasingly irrelevant, which ultimately overshadows many of the album's redeemable moments".

== Commercial performance ==
Romance debuted and peaked at number three on the US Billboard 200 dated December 21, 2019, with 86,000 album-equivalent units, including 54,000 pure album sales, 30,000 stream-equivalent sales (resulting from 40.6 million on-demand streams), and 2,000 track-equivalent sales. Romance's streaming start is the third-largest streaming debut for a 2019 female pop album, behind American singers Ariana Grande and Taylor Swift's albums, Thank U, Next and Lover, respectively. The album was certified platinum by the Recording Industry Association of America (RIAA) in May 2020, for selling 1,000,000 album-equivalent units.

In Canada, Romance debuted at number one on the Canadian Albums Chart. With 14,000 total consumption units and the highest sales total for the week, it became Cabello's second album to do so, following 2018's Camila. It descended to number seven during its second week on the chart, and stayed in the top ten for the next four weeks. The album has been certified Platinum by Music Canada in January 2020. Romance also debuted and peaked at number fourteen in the UK, becoming Cabello's second top twenty album. It fell to number twenty-nine the following week. Romance has been certified Silver in the UK for selling 60,000 units.

Romance reached the top ten in eleven countries including Australia, Canada, New Zealand, Mexico and the United States, and the top twenty in six countries including the UK. Additionally, the album received a Platinum certification in Brazil for selling 40,000 units, and 3× Platinum in Norway.

== Track listing ==
Romance track listing
No.	Title	Writer(s)	Producer(s)	Length
1.	"Shameless"	Camila Cabello; Andrew Wotman; Alexandra Tamposi; Stefan Johnson; Jordan K. Johnson; Jon Bellion	Andrew Watt; The Monsters and Strangerz	3:39
2.	"Living Proof"	Cabello; Tamposi; Justin Tranter; Mattias Larsson; Robin Fredriksson	Mattman & Robin	3:14
3.	"Should've Said It"	Cabello; Louis Bell; Adam Feeney; Nate Mercereau; Eric Frederic; Wotman; Tamposi	Frank Dukes; Mercereau; Ricky Reed; Bell^{[m]}	3:20
4.	"My Oh My" (featuring DaBaby)	Cabello; Jonathan Kirk; Bell; Feeney; Savan Kotecha; Anthony Clemons, Jr.; Alejandro Guillermo Marambio Altamirano	Dukes; Bell^{[m]}	2:50
5.	"Señorita" (with Shawn Mendes)	Cabello; Mendes; Wotman; Benjamin Levin; Tamposi; Charlotte Emma Aitchison; Jack Patterson; Magnus August Høiberg	Watt; Benny Blanco; Cashmere Cat^{[a]}	3:10
6.	"Liar"	Cabello; Wotman; Tamposi; S. Johnson; J. Johnson; Bellion; Jenny Berggren; Jonas Berggren; Malin Berggren; Ulf Ekberg; Lionel Richie	Watt; The Monsters and Strangerz; Jon Bellion^{[m]}	3:27
7.	"Bad Kind of Butterflies"	Cabello; Philip Constable; Tamposi; Lindsay Gilbert; Crystal Nicole; J. Johnson; S. Johnson; Oliver Peterhof	DJ HardWerk; The Monsters and Strangerz; German	2:49
8.	"Easy"	Cabello; Tranter; John Hill; Feeney; Bell; Carter Lang; Westen Weiss	Hill; Dukes; Bell; Lang; Weiss	3:14
9.	"Feel It Twice"	Cabello; Bell; Feeney; Tommy Paxton Beesley; Matthew Tavares	Dukes; Tavares	3:08
10.	"Dream of You"	Cabello; Larsson; Fredriksson; Tranter	Mattman & Robin	3:42
11.	"Cry for Me"	Cabello; Ryan Tedder; Feeney; Bell	Dukes; Bell	3:09
12.	"This Love"	Cabello; Sam Roman; Dayyon Alexander Drinkard; Jeff Shum	Rush Hr; RØMANS	3:40
13.	"Used to This"	Cabello; Finneas O'Connell; Amy Wadge	Finneas^{[v]}; Bart Schoudel	3:30
14.	"First Man"	Cabello; Jordan Reynolds; Wadge	Finneas; Reynolds	3:48
Total length:				46:40

=== Notes ===
- ^{^[a]} signifies an additional producer.
- ^{^[m]} signifies a miscellaneous producer.
- ^{^[v]} signifies also a vocal producer.
- "My Oh My" does not appear on the standard CD edition of Romance.
- "Living Proof" contains a sample of "Meter Connection", a recording by Andy Jones for the Africa Heartwood Project.
- "Liar" interpolates "All Night Long (All Night)" written by Lionel Richie and "All That She Wants" written by Jenny Berggren, Jonas Berggren, Malin Berggren and Ulf Ekberg.

== Personnel ==
Credits were adapted from AllMusic and Tidal.

=== Vocals ===
- Camila Cabello – vocals, backing vocals
- Shawn Mendes – vocals
- DaBaby – featured vocals
- Mattman & Robin – backing vocals
- Andrew Watt – backing vocals

=== Instrumentation ===
- Tommy Paxton Beesley – guitar
- Zara Benyounes – violin
- Benny Blanco – keyboards
- Mattias Bylund – horn, recorder
- Natalia Bonner – violin
- Meghan Cassidy – viola
- Cashmere Cat – keyboards
- Rosie Danvers – cello, strings
- Tommy Danvers – keyboards, strings
- DJ HardWerk – instrumentation
- Frank Dukes – bass guitar, percussion
- Finneas – bass, drum programming, electric guitar, piano, synthesizer
- German – instrumentation
- Sally Jackson – violin
- Peter Noos Johansson – trombone
- Patrick Kiernan – violin
- Eleanor Mathieson – violin
- Mattman & Robin – instrumentation, bass, brass, guitar, handclapping, keyboards, percussion, piano, synthesizer
- Shawn Mendes – guitar
- Steve Morris – violin
- Jane Oliver – cello
- Emma Owens – viola
- Hayley Pomfrett – violin
- Ellie Stanford – violin
- Matthew Tavares – guitar, synthesizer
- The Monsters and the Strangerz – keyboards
- Watt – guitar, keyboards, bass

=== Production ===
- Louis Bell – production, miscellaneous production
- Benny Blanco – production
- DJ HardWerk – production
- Frank Dukes – production
- Finneas – production, vocal production
- German – production
- John Hill – production
- Carter Lang – production
- Mattman & Robin – production
- Nate Mercereau – production
- Ricky Reed – production
- Jordan Reynolds – production
- Romans – production
- Rush Hr – production
- Matthew Tavares – production
- The Monsters and the Strangerz – production
- Westen Weiss – production
- Jon Bellion – miscellaneous production
- Cashmere Cat – additional production
- Bart Schoudel – vocal production
- Gregg Golterman – production coordination
- Christian Johnson – production coordination
- Jeremy "J Boogs" Levin – production coordination
- David Silberstein – production coordination

=== Technical ===
- Mike Bozzi – mastering
- Dave Kutch – mastering
- Chris Galland – mixing, assistant engineering
- Serban Ghenea – mixing
- John Hanes – mixing, engineering
- Manny Marroquin – mixing
- Benny Blanco – programming
- Cashmere Cat – programming
- DJ Hardwerk – programming
- German – programming
- Mattman & Robin – programming
- The Monsters and the Strangerz – programming
- Watt – programming
- Nick Taylor – engineering
- Nathaniel Alford – recording, vocal engineering
- Louis Bell – recording, vocal engineering
- Ryan Dulude – recording
- Paul Lamalfa – recording
- Dustin Park – recording
- Jordan Reynolds – recording
- Bart Schoudel – recording, vocal engineering
- Brian Taylor – recording
- Zubin Thakkar – vocal engineering

=== Business and design ===
- Anita Marisa Boriboon – creative direction
- Amber Park – creative direction, design
- Diego L. Rodriguez – design assistant
- Bella P. Santos – design assistant
- Alana Truong – design assistant
- Amanda Charchian – photography

== Charts ==
=== Weekly charts ===
Weekly chart performance
Chart (2019–2020)	Peak position
Argentine Albums (CAPIF)	7
Australian Albums (ARIA)	6
Austrian Albums (Ö3 Austria)	35
Belgian Albums (Ultratop Flanders)	16
Belgian Albums (Ultratop Wallonia)	58
Canadian Albums (Billboard)	1
Danish Albums (Hitlisten)	32
Dutch Albums (Album Top 100)	8
Estonian Albums (Eesti Ekspress)	8
Finnish Albums (Suomen virallinen lista)	16
French Albums (SNEP)	52
German Albums (Offizielle Top 100)	55
Greek Albums (IFPI)	26
Icelandic Albums (Tónlistinn)	29
Irish Albums (IRMA)	12
Italian Albums (FIMI)	44
Japan Hot Albums (Billboard Japan)	33
Japanese Albums (Oricon)	35
Latvian Albums (LAIPA)	10
Lithuanian Albums (AGATA)	5
Mexican Albums (AMPROFON)	2
New Zealand Albums (RMNZ)	7
Norwegian Albums (VG-lista)	14
Polish Albums (ZPAV)	32
Portuguese Albums (AFP)	10
Scottish Albums (Official Charts)	22
Slovak Albums (ČNS IFPI)	64
Spanish Albums (PROMUSICAE)	8
South Korean Albums (Gaon)	48
Swedish Albums (Sverigetopplistan)	23
Swiss Albums (Schweizer Hitparade)	19
UK Albums (Official Charts)	14
US Billboard 200	3

=== Year-end charts ===
Year-end chart performance
Chart (2019)	Position
Mexican Albums (AMPROFON)	72
Chart (2020)	Position
Canadian Albums (Billboard)	26
Dutch Albums (Album Top 100)	88
French Albums (SNEP)	178
New Zealand Albums (RMNZ)	49
US Billboard 200	56

== Certifications ==
Certifications and sales
Region	Certification	Certified units/sales
Brazil (Pro-Música Brasil)	Platinum	40,000^{‡}
Canada (Music Canada)	2× Platinum	160,000^{‡}
Denmark (IFPI Danmark)	Gold	10,000^{‡}
France (SNEP)	Gold	50,000^{‡}
Mexico (AMPROFON)	Gold	30,000^{‡}
New Zealand (RMNZ)	2× Platinum	30,000^{‡}
Norway (IFPI Norway)	3× Platinum	60,000^{‡}
Poland (ZPAV)	Platinum	20,000^{‡}
Singapore (RIAS)	Gold	5,000^{*}
United Kingdom (BPI)	Gold	100,000^{‡}
United States (RIAA)	Platinum	1,000,000^{‡}
^{*} Sales figures based on certification alone.^{‡} Sales+streaming figures based on certification alone.

== Release history ==
Release dats and formats
Region	Date	Format(s)	Label	Ref.
Various	December 6, 2019	CD; digital download; streaming	Epic; Syco	
Various	January 30, 2020	Cassette	Epic; Syco	
Various	January 30, 2020	CD (alternate covers)	Epic; Syco	
Various	February 14, 2020	LP	Epic; Syco	

== See also ==
- List of number-one albums of 2019 (Canada)
