= Easy (Camila Cabello song) =

2019 promotional single by Camila Cabello

Promotional single by Camila Cabello

from the album Romance
- Released: October 11, 2019
- Recorded: September 2019
- Studio: Electric Feel Recordings (West Hollywood, California)
- Genre: Pop
- Length: 3:14
- Label: Epic; Syco
- Songwriter(s): Camila Cabello; Justin Tranter; John Hill; Adam Feeney; Louis Bell; Carter Lang; Westen Weiss
- Producer(s): Frank Dukes; Bell; Lang; Weiss; Hill

Audio video
- "Easy" on YouTube

"Easy" is a song by American singer and songwriter Camila Cabello from her second studio album Romance (2019). It was released by Epic Records and Syco on October 11, 2019, as the second promotional single from the album. Cabello co-wrote the song with Justin Tranter and its producers John Hill, Louis Bell, Frank Dukes, Carter Lang, and Westen Weiss. "Easy" debuted in the top 100 of several countries, including Australia, Canada, the UK, Slovakia, and Ireland. Although it did not enter the US Billboard Hot 100, it debuted at number ten on the Bubbling Under Hot 100 chart.

== Background and composition ==
Cabello announced the song's release on October 9, 2019, via her social media.

"Easy" was written by Cabello, Justin Tranter, John Hill, Adam Feeney, Louis Bell, Carter Lang and Westen Weiss. It runs for three minutes and sixteen seconds. Hugh McIntyre of Forbes characterized "Easy" as a pop song.

Throughout the track, Cabello can be heard addressing her many insecurities and things that she does not like about herself, such as overthinking to the point where things are ruined, her "crooked teeth" and the stretch marks on her thighs. The track is about how her partner helped her love herself and finding true love for the first time.

== Live performances ==
Cabello performed the song live for the first time on Saturday Night Live on October 12, 2019. She also performed the song with other singles from the album at Apple Music's New Music Daily Presents event for select fans in November 2019. On the 8th of December, Cabello performed the song on Michael McIntyre's Big Show.

== Track listings ==
Digital download
No.	Title	Length
1.	"Easy"	3:14

Digital download – live version
No.	Title	Length
1.	"Easy" (Live)	3:16

== Credits and personnel ==
Credits adapted from the liner notes of Romance.

Publishing

- Published by Sony/ATV Songs LLC (BMI) o/b/o Sony/ATV Music Publishing (UK) LTD/Maidmetal Limited (PRS)/Milamoon Songs (BMI) / EMI Blackwood Music Inc. o/b/o EMI Music Publishing LTD (PRS)/MYNY Music (BMI)/Sony/ATV Songs LLC (BMI) o/b/o Sam Fam Beats (BMI), EMI April Music Inc. (ASCAP) / Carter Lang Publishing Designee / Universal Music Corp./Efeel Music/Westen Weiss Prod. LLC (ASCAP) / EMI Pop Music Publishing / Rodeman Music (GMR) / Justin's School for Girls (BMI) all rights o/b/o itself and Justin's School for Girls admin. by Warner-Tamerlane Publishing Corp. (BMI)

Recording

- Recorded at Electric Feel Recording Studios, West Hollywood, California
- Mixed at MixStar Studios, Virginia Beach, Virginia
- Mastered at Bernie Grundman Mastering, Hollywood, California

Personnel

- Camila Cabello – vocals, songwriting
- Louis Bell – production, songwriting, recording
- Frank Dukes – production, songwriting
- Carter Lang – production, songwriting
- Westen Weiss – production, songwriting
- John Hill – songwriting
- Justin Tranter – songwriting
- Mike Bozzi – mastering
- Manny Marroquin – mixing

== Charts ==
Chart (2019)	Peak position
Australia (ARIA)	76
Belgium (Ultratip Bubbling Under Flanders)	19
Canada (Canadian Hot 100)	82
France (SNEP Sales Chart)	110
Greece (IFPI)	63
Ireland (IRMA)	67
Lithuania (AGATA)	46
New Zealand Hot Singles (RMNZ)	8
Scotland (OCC)	58
Slovakia (Singles Digitál Top 100)	93
Sweden Heatseeker (Sverigetopplistan)	11
UK Singles (OCC)	86
US Bubbling Under Hot 100 (Billboard)	10
US Digital Song Sales (Billboard)	10

== Certifications ==
Region	Certification	Certified units/sales
Brazil (Pro-Música Brasil)	Platinum	40,000^{‡}
^{‡} Sales+streaming figures based on certification alone.

== Release history ==
Release dates and formats for "Easy"
Region	Date	Format	Version	Label	Ref.
Various	October 11, 2019	Digital download; streaming	Original	Epic; Syco	
Various	December 20, 2019	Digital download; streaming	Live	Epic; Syco	
