= Cry for Me (Camila Cabello song) =

2019 promotional single by Camila Cabello

Promotional single by Camila Cabello

from the album Romance
- Released: October 4, 2019
- Recorded: May 2019
- Studio: Electric Feel Recordings (West Hollywood, California)
- Genre: Pop rock
- Length: 3:09
- Label: Epic; Syco
- Songwriter(s): Camila Cabello; Ryan Tedder; Adam Feeney; Louis Bell
- Producer(s): Frank Dukes; Bell

Audio video
- "Cry for Me" on YouTube

"Cry for Me" is a song by American singer and songwriter Camila Cabello from her second studio album Romance (2019). It was released by Epic Records and Syco on October 4, 2019, as the first promotional single from the album.

== Background and composition ==
In her announcement of the song, Cabello called the song one of her "favorites" and explained that it was written about "when your ex moves on faster than you and of course you want them to be happy but just..... not so fast". Two days later Cabello explained the track further more, saying "I wrote a song back when I was 16 called I’m Pissed Off You’re Happy, about a situation where someone and I broke up and sooner than I expected, they moved on, they were having fun and happy and dating and I was just like.... what the hell, that didn’t take very long. I took that idea and put it into this song, the feeling nobody likes to admit about feeling wild with jealousy". It was written by Camila Cabello, Ryan Tedder, Adam Feeney and Louis Bell. The song runs for three minutes and nine seconds.

== Critical reception ==
Emily Zemler of Rolling Stone described the song as a "pop number" that takes on that feeling after a breakup where you want your ex to be just as miserable as you are".

== Promotion ==
Cabello announced the track's release on social media on October 2, 2019.

== Live performances ==
Cabello first performed "Cry for Me" on Saturday Night Live, on October 12, 2019.

== Credits and personnel ==
Credits adapted from the liner notes of Romance.

Publishing

- Published by Sony/ATV Songs LLC (BMI) o/b/o Sony/ATV Music Publishing (UK) LTD/Maidmetal Limited (PRS)/Milamoon Songs (BMI) / EMI Blackwood Music Inc. o/b/o EMI Music Publishing LTD (PRS)/MYNY Music (BMI)/Sony/ATV Songs LLC (BMI) o/b/o Sam Fam Beats (BMI), EMI April Music Inc. (ASCAP), Write Me a Song Publishing (GMR) admin. by Downtown Music Publishing LLC

Recording

- Recorded at Electric Feel Recording Studios, West Hollywood, California
- Mixed at Larrabee Studio, North Hollywood, California
- Mastered at the Mastering Palace, New York City, New York

Personnel

- Camila Cabello – lead vocals, songwriting
- Frank Dukes – songwriting, production
- Louis Bell – songwriting, vocals production, recording engineering
- Ryan Tedder – songwriting
- Manny Marroquin – mixing
- Chris Galland – assistant mixing
- Dave Kutch – mastering

== Charts ==
Chart performance for "Cry for Me"
Chart (2019)	Peak position
Belgium (Ultratip Bubbling Under Flanders)	20
Canada (Canadian Hot 100)	81
Czech Republic (Singles Digitál Top 100)	78
Greece (IFPI)	40
Ireland (IRMA)	57
Lithuania (AGATA)	35
New Zealand Hot Singles (RMNZ)	5
Portugal (AFP)	88
Scotland (OCC)	48
Slovakia (Singles Digitál Top 100)	50
Sweden (Sverigetopplistan)	95
Switzerland (Schweizer Hitparade)	90
UK Singles (OCC)	85
US Bubbling Under Hot 100 (Billboard)	15
US Digital Song Sales (Billboard)	29
Venezuela Anglo (Record Report)	52

== Certifications ==
Certifications for "Cry for Me"
Region	Certification	Certified units/sales
Brazil (Pro-Música Brasil)	Gold	20,000^{‡}
^{‡} Sales+streaming figures based on certification alone.

== Release history ==
Release history and formats for "Cry for Me"
Region	Date	Format	Label	Ref.
Various	October 4, 2019	Digital download; streaming	Epic; Syco	
