= First Man (song) =

2019 song by Camila Cabello

Single by Camila Cabello

from the album Romance
- Released: June 18, 2020
- Recorded: November 2018
- Studio: Jordan's House (Nashville, Tennessee)
- Genre: Pop rock
- Length: 3:49
- Label: Epic; Syco
- Songwriter(s): Camila Cabello; Amy Wadge; Jordan Reynolds
- Producer(s): Jordan Reynolds; Finneas

Camila Cabello singles chronology
"My Oh My" (2020)	"First Man" (2020)	"Don't Go Yet" (2021)

Music video
- "First Man" on YouTube

"First Man" is a song by American singer and songwriter Camila Cabello from her second studio album Romance (2019). It was released by Epic Records and Syco on June 18, 2020, as the fifth and final single from the album. It was written by Cabello alongside Amy Wadge and Jordan Reynolds, with the latter producing it with Finneas. An official music video for "First Man" was released the previous day, in celebration of Father's Day. It features clips from Cabello's childhood with many of the footage containing videos of her and her father.

"First Man" peaked at number 94 on the US Billboard Hot 100, following Cabello's live performance of the song at the 62nd Grammy Awards. Musically, "First Man" is a pop rock piano ballad. Lyrically, the song is about Cabello's relationship with her father while she is in a romantic relationship with a "good guy".

== Background and composition ==
"First Man" was confirmed with the album's track list on November 29, 2019.

It was written by Camila Cabello, Jordan Reynolds and Amy Wadge. It runs for three minutes and forty-nine seconds. "First Man" is a pop-rock piano ballad. Cabello wrote the song about her relationship with her father while she is in a romantic relationship with a "good guy." In terms of music notation, "First Man" was composed using 4/4 common time in the key of G major, with a tempo of 100 beats per minute. Cabello's vocal range spans from the low note D_{3} to the high note of D_{5}, giving the song two octaves of range. The tempo has a passionate feel.

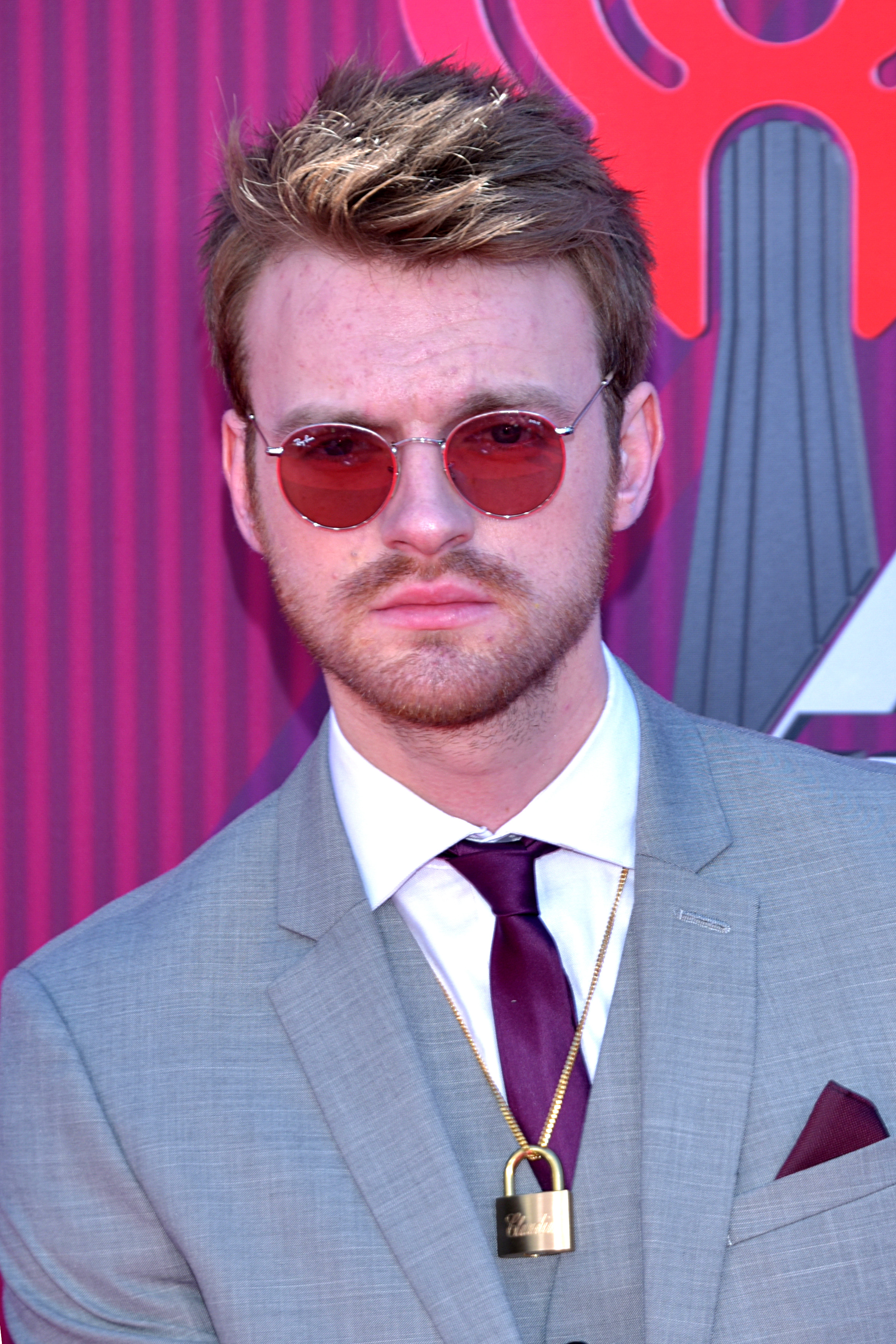
Finneas, one of the producers of the song.

== Music video ==
The official music video for the song was released on Cabello's YouTube channel on June 21, 2020, in celebration of Father's Day.

The video features clips from Cabello's childhood with many of the footage containing videos of her and her father. Cabello watches the footage on a television while singing to her dad. In the description Cabello dedicated the video to her father.

== Live performances ==
On November 2, 2019, Camila performed the song on New Music Daily Presents: Camila Cabello, a special live show from New Music Daily of Apple Music in the heart of Los Angeles celebrating the release of her album Romance. Cabello performed "First Man" at the 62nd Grammy Awards ceremony that took place at the Staples Center in Los Angeles on January 26, 2020.

== Commercial performance ==
Just one day after the Grammy awards ceremony, sales of "First Man" had already increased by over 68,000%, and that rose to over 81,000% a day later. In those two days, the track sold over 11,000 copies. The cut was also the fourth-most-streamed song the day after the Grammys. The track racked up 1.4 million streams in the 24 hours following an increase of 890%. In the US, "First Man" debuted at number 94 on the Billboard Hot 100, becoming Cabello's 16th career entry. In New Zealand the song peaked at number 34 on the Hot Singles chart.

== Track listings ==
Digital download
No.	Title	Length
1.	"First Man"	3:48

Digital download – live version
No.	Title	Length
1.	"First Man" (Live)	3:56

== Credits and personnel ==
Credits adapted from the liner notes of Romance.

Publishing

- Published by Sony/ATV Songs LLC (BMI) o/b/o Sony/ATV Music Publishing (UK) LTD/Maidmetal Limited (PRS)/Milamoon Songs (BMI) / WC Music Corp. o/b/o itself. Buckeye25 (ASCAP) and Jreynmusic (ASCAP) / WC Music Corp. (ASCAP) o/b/o itself. Cookie Jar Music LLP (ASCAP) and Warner Chappell Music Ltd.

Recording

- Recorded by Jordan Reynolds at Jordan's House, Nashville, Tennessee
- Mixed by Serban Ghenea at MixStar Studios, Virginia Beach, Virginia
- Mastered at the Mastering Palace, New York City, New York

Personnel

- Camila Cabello – lead vocals, songwriting
- Jordan Reynolds – production, songwriting
- Finneas – production
- Amy Wadge – songwriting
- John Hanes – engineering
- Serban Ghenea – mixing
- Dave Kutch – mastering

== Charts ==
Chart (2020)	Peak position
Canadian Digital Song Sales (Billboard)	15
New Zealand Hot Singles (RMNZ)	34
US Billboard Hot 100	94
US Digital Song Sales (Billboard)	6

== Release history ==
Release dates and formats for "First Man"
Region	Date	Format	Version	Label	Ref.
Various	December 6, 2019	Digital download; streaming	Original	Epic; Syco	
Various	December 20, 2019	Digital download; streaming	Live	Epic; Syco	
United States	June 18, 2020	Contemporary hit radio; adult contemporary; Rhythmic contemporary	Original	Epic; Syco	
