= Shameless (Camila Cabello song) =

2019 single by Camila Cabello

Single by Camila Cabello

from the album Romance
- Released: September 5, 2019
- Studio: Gold Tooth Music (Beverly Hills, California); SARM (London, England)
- Genre: Power pop; pop punk; pop-rock
- Length: 3:39
- Label: Epic; Syco
- Songwriters: Camila Cabello; Alexandra Tamposi; Andrew Wotman; Jonathan Bellion; Martin Bresso; Jordan Johnson; Stefan Johnson
- Producers: Andrew Watt; Tchami; The Monsters and the Strangerz

Camila Cabello singles chronology
| "South of the Border" (2019) | "Shameless" and "Liar" (2019) | "Living Proof" (2019) |

Music video
- "Shameless" on YouTube

"Shameless" is a song by American singer and songwriter Camila Cabello from her second studio album Romance (2019). It was released alongside "Liar" on September 5, 2019, as a double lead single from the album. Written by Cabello, Ali Tamposi, Andrew Watt, Jon Bellion, Martin Bresso, Jordan Johnson and Stefan Johnson, and produced by Watt and the Monsters and the Strangerz, the song is about Cabello finally facing her feelings about someone she loved. The song reached the top 10 in Hungary.

The music video was directed by Henry Scholfield, and was released on the same day as the single's release on YouTube. In the first half of 2023, "Shameless" received a viral resurgence in popularity via TikTok, with the audio most notably focusing on the bridge of the song. Sped-up versions of the song also emerged.

== Background and promotion ==
On September 1, 2019, Cabello posted a teaser of an upcoming project titled Romance. The first chapter is set to be released on September 5. In the following days, she went on to upload several pictures depicting the cover art for two songs titled "Shameless" and "Liar". She eventually revealed the official cover art of the song on September 4.

== Composition ==
"Shameless" is a power pop-punk and pop rock song with a dark edge. The song was written by Cabello, Alexandra Tamposi, Andrew Wotman, Jonathan Bellion, Jordan Johnson and Stefan Johnson. The song runs for three minutes and thirty-nine seconds. "Shameless" was composed using 4/4 common time in the key of E minor with a moderately fast tempo of 130 beats per minute. The song follows the chord progression of Em-D-C-G-Am. Cabello's vocal range spans from the low note E_{3} to the high note of E_{5}, giving the song a two octave vocal range.

== Music video ==
"Shameless"'s music video was filmed on August 12, 2019, in Los Angeles. It contains several scenes of the singer performing in various locations, such as singing in a Catholic confessional booth, dancing alongside a group of impersonators wearing red dresses, crawling inside a burning room, and running through a street while wearing a white dress. The video was released on September 5, 2019.

== Track listings ==
Digital download
| No. | Title | Length |
|---|---|---|
| 1. | "Shameless" | 3:39 |

Digital download – live version
| No. | Title | Length |
|---|---|---|
| 1. | "Shameless" (live) | 3:55 |

Digital download – sped up version
| No. | Title | Length |
|---|---|---|
| 1. | "Shameless" (sped up) | 3:19 |

== Credits and personnel ==
Credits were adapted from the liner notes of Romance.

=== Recording ===
- Recorded at Gold Tooth Music, Beverly Hills, California, and SARM Studios, London, England
- Mixed at MixStar Studios, Virginia Beach, Virginia
- Mastered at the Mastering Palace, New York City, New York

=== Personnel ===
- Camila Cabello – vocals, songwriting
- Andrew Watt – production, songwriting, guitar, keyboards, instrumentation, programming
- The Monsters and the Strangerz – production, keyboards, instrumentation, programming
- Jon Bellion – miscellaneous production, songwriting
- Alexandra Tamposi – songwriting
- Jordan Johnson – songwriting
- Stefan Johnson – songwriting
- Manny Marroquin – mixing
- Chris Galland – assistant mixing
- Paul Lamalfa – recording
- Nathaniel Alford – additional vocal engineering
- Dave Kutch – mastering

== Charts ==
| Chart (2019) | Peak position |
|---|---|
| Australia (ARIA) | 62 |
| Austria (Ö3 Austria Top 40) | 63 |
| Belgium (Ultratip Bubbling Under Flanders) | 15 |
| Belgium (Ultratip Bubbling Under Wallonia) | 3 |
| Canada Hot 100 (Billboard) | 40 |
| Canada CHR/Top 40 (Billboard) | 36 |
| Croatia (HRT) | 94 |
| Czech Republic Singles Digital (ČNS IFPI) | 59 |
| France (SNEP Sales Chart) | 48 |
| Germany (GfK) | 95 |
| Greece (IFPI) | 15 |
| Hungary (Single Top 40) | 9 |
| Hungary (Stream Top 40) | 23 |
| Ireland (IRMA) | 36 |
| Lithuania (AGATA) | 20 |
| Mexico (Billboard Mexican Airplay) | 37 |
| Netherlands (Single Tip) | 2 |
| New Zealand Hot Singles (RMNZ) | 12 |
| Portugal (AFP) | 52 |
| Scottish Singles Sales (Official Charts) | 38 |
| Singapore (RIAS) | 23 |
| Slovakia Singles Digital (ČNS IFPI) | 50 |
| Sweden Heatseeker (Sverigetopplistan) | 16 |
| Switzerland (Schweizer Hitparade) | 71 |
| UK Singles (Official Charts) | 50 |
| US Billboard Hot 100 | 60 |
| US Pop Airplay (Billboard) | 27 |
| US Rolling Stone Top 100 | 54 |

== Certifications ==
| Region | Certification | Certified units/sales |
|---|---|---|
| Brazil (Pro-Música Brasil) | 2× Platinum | 80,000^{‡} |
| Canada (Music Canada) | Gold | 40,000^{‡} |
| Denmark (IFPI Danmark) | Gold | 45,000^{‡} |
| France (SNEP) | Platinum | 200,000^{‡} |
| Germany (BVMI) | Gold | 300,000^{‡} |
| New Zealand (RMNZ) | Platinum | 30,000^{‡} |
| Poland (ZPAV) | 2× Platinum | 100,000^{‡} |
| United Kingdom (BPI) | Gold | 400,000^{‡} |
| United States (RIAA) | Gold | 500,000^{‡} |
^{‡} Sales+streaming figures based on certification alone.

== Release history ==
Release dates and formats
| Region | Date | Format | Version | Label | Ref. |
|---|---|---|---|---|---|
| Various | September 5, 2019 | Digital download; streaming | Original | Epic; Syco | |
| United Kingdom | September 6, 2019 | Contemporary hit radio | Original | Epic; Syco | |
| Various | December 12, 2019 | 12-inch picture disc | Original | Epic; Syco | |
| Various | December 20, 2019 | Digital download; streaming | Live | Epic; Syco | |
| Various | February 25, 2020 | 7-inch vinyl | Original | Epic; Syco | |
| Various | February 9, 2020 | Digital download; streaming | Sped Up | Epic; Syco | |
