= Living Proof (Camila Cabello song) =

2019 single by Camila Cabello

Single by Camila Cabello

from the album Romance
- Released: November 15, 2019
- Studio: House Mouse (Stockholm); Westlake (Los Angeles); Henson (Los Angeles); Borgen (Partille, Sweden)
- Genre: Pop
- Length: 3:14
- Label: Epic; Syco
- Songwriters: Ali Tamposi; Camila Cabello; Justin Tranter; Mattias Larsson; Robin Fredriksson
- Producer: Mattman & Robin

Camila Cabello singles chronology
"Shameless" / "Liar" (2019)	"Living Proof" (2019)	"My Oh My" (2020)

Music video
- "Living Proof" on YouTube

"Living Proof" is a song by American singer and songwriter Camila Cabello from her second studio album Romance (2019). It was released by Epic Records and Syco on November 15, 2019, as the third single from the album.

== Background ==
Cabello first teased the song in February 2019. She later announced the song's release on November 13, 2019. Cabello has stated that the song is one of her favorites she wrote for Romance, stating that it was "her way of coping as a hopeless romantic".

== Composition ==
"Living Proof" is a pop song that runs for 3 minutes and 14 seconds. The song opens with a clapping beat and a steady guitar. Cabello uses religious imagery to describe her relationship with her lover, in addition to a falsetto used "in stomping and catchy chorus". The song's opening contains a sample of a recording by Andy Jones for his The Africa Heartwood Project, which contains orphans singing.

== Music video ==
The Alan Ferguson-directed music video was released on November 24, 2019, the night of Cabello's American Music Awards performance of the song. It was inspired by the John Everett Millais painting Ophelia, which depicts the Shakespearean character Ophelia floating in a pool covered in flowers. Throughout the video, she is seen frolicking with a group of dancers and laying in a bed of petals. As of November 2020, it has over 22 million views and 502 thousand likes on YouTube.

== Live performances ==
Cabello debuted the song at the American Music Awards, where she also performed "Señorita" alongside Shawn Mendes and "Shake It Off" alongside Taylor Swift and Halsey. On December 5, 2019, Cabello performed the song on The Tonight Show Starring Jimmy Fallon, as well as on The Ellen DeGeneres Show the next day.

== Credits and personnel ==
Credits adapted from the liner notes of Romance.

Publishing

- Published by Sony/ATV Songs LLC (BMI) o/b/o Sony/ATV Music Publishing (UK) LTD/Maidmetal Limited (PRS)/Milamoon Songs (BMI) / WB Music Corp. (ASCAP) o/b/o Wolf Cousins and Warner/Chappel Music Scandinavia AB (STM) / Justin’s School for Girls (BMI) all rights o/b/o itself and Justin’s School for Girls admin. by Warner-Tamerlane Publishing Corp. (BMI) / © Reservoir 416 (BMI)/Ali Tamposi (BMI) all rights admin. by Reservoir Media Management, Inc.
- Contains elements from "Meter Competition", courtesy of The Africa Heartwood Project

Recording

- Recorded at House Mouse Studios, Stockholm, Sweden, and by Ryan Dulude at Westlake Recording Studios, Los Angeles, California, and by Dustin Park at Henson Recording Studios, Los Angeles, California
- Mixed at MixStar Studios, Virginia Beach, Virginia
- Mastered at the Mastering Palace, New York City, New York
- Horns recorded and edited by Mattias Bylund at Studio Borgen, Partille, Sweden

Personnel

- Camila Cabello – vocals, songwriting, background vocals
- Ali Tamposi – songwriting
- Justin Tranter – songwriting
- Mattias Bylund – horn
- Peter Noos Johansson – trombone
- Serban Ghenea – mixing
- Mattman & Robin – production, songwriting, instrumentation, programming, keyboards, bass, guitar, claps, percussion, piano, brass, background vocals
- John Hanes – engineering
- Dustin Park – recording
- Ryan Dulude – recording
- Dave Kutch – mastering

== Charts ==
Chart (2019)	Peak position
Canada Hot 100 (Billboard)	84
Greece (IFPI Greece)	82
Ireland (IRMA)	82
Lithuania (AGATA)	51
New Zealand Hot Singles (RMNZ)	10

== Certifications ==
Region	Certification	Certified units/sales
Brazil (Pro-Música Brasil)	Platinum	40,000^{‡}
^{‡} Sales+streaming figures based on certification alone.

== Release history ==
Region	Date	Format	Label	Ref.
Various	November 15, 2019	Digital download; streaming	Epic; Syco	
Australia	November 15, 2019	Radio airplay	Sony Music Australia	
United States	November 15, 2019	Contemporary hit radio; adult contemporary radio; Rhythmic contemporary	Epic	
United Kingdom	December 6, 2019	Contemporary hit radio	Syco	
