= My Oh My (Camila Cabello song) =

2020 single by Camila Cabello featuring DaBaby

- Remix cover

Single by Camila Cabello featuring DaBaby

from the album Romance
- Released: January 6, 2020
- Studio: Electric Feel (West Hollywood); Henson (Hollywood)
- Genre: Pop
- Length: 2:51
- Label: Epic; Syco
- Songwriters: Camila Cabello; Jonathan Kirk; Louis Bell; Adam Feeney; Savan Kotecha; Anthony Clemons Jr.; Pochi Marambio; Sergio Kitchens (remix only)
- Producer: Frank Dukes

Camila Cabello singles chronology
"Living Proof" (2019)	"My Oh My" (2020)	"First Man" (2020)

DaBaby singles chronology
"Suboxone" (2019)	"My Oh My" (2020)	"Shut Up" (2020)

Music video
- "My Oh My" on YouTube

"My Oh My" is a song by American singer and songwriter Camila Cabello featuring American rapper DaBaby from her second studio album Romance (2019). It was later released by Epic Records and Syco on January 6, 2020, as the fourth single from the album. It was written by the artists, Savan Kotecha, Ant Clemons, and producers Frank Dukes & Louis Bell. Due to similarities between the song and Peruvian reggae band Tierra Sur's 1992 song "Llaman a la puerta", group leader Alejandro "Pochi" Marambio received a writing credit.

"My Oh My" peaked at number 12 on the US Billboard Hot 100, and also reached the top 10 in Ireland and Israel, as well as the top 20 in Australia, Canada, Finland, and the United Kingdom. It received a diamond certification in Brazil, double platinum in the United States and New Zealand, and platinum in Australia and the United Kingdom. A music video was released on February 12, 2020, which portrays Cabello as an actress who overcame being cast as a damsel in distress with the assistance of an up-and-coming director portrayed by DaBaby. A remix of the song featuring American rapper Gunna was released on May 1, 2020.

== Background and composition ==
The recording process for Cabello's second studio album Romance took under ten months, and concluded in October 2019. "My Oh My" was first teased by The Sun on November 27, 2019, where the writer Howell Davies stated that the carnal song "is her naughtiest yet" and compared it to the 2017 song "Havana".

Musically, "My Oh My" is a two-minute and fifty one second reggaeton-influenced pop song with a pop-rap and R&B-pop beat. According to the sheet music published at Musicnotes.com by Sony/ATV Music Publishing, "My Oh My" was composed using 4/4 common time in the key of C minor, with a moderate tempo of 104 beats per minute. The song follows the chord progression of Cm–A♭–G. Cabello's vocal range spans from the low note G_{3} to the high note of F_{5}, giving the song one octave and six notes of range. The lyrics describe Cabello's intentions to date a "bad boy", which is not approved by her family.

It has been noted that parts of the song constitute musical plagiarism. In December 2019, Twitter users pointed out similarities between "My Oh My" and the 1992 song "Llaman a la puerta" by the Peruvian reggae band Tierra Sur. According to reporter Eilish O'Sullivan from The Daily Dot, "the songs' call and responses are what make them sound especially similar". Pochi Marambio, Tierra Sur's bandleader and composer of "Llaman a la puerta," announced on social media that he had hired a legal entity to contact Cabello or her representatives to reach an amicable settlement.

== Commercial performance ==
Following the release of Romance, "My Oh My" debuted at number 82 on the US Billboard Hot 100 before peaking at number 12, becoming the second highest-charting single from the album behind "Señorita" (2019), which topped the chart in August 2019. It also debuted at number 35 on the Mainstream Top 40, where it peaked at number one on the chart dated May 9, 2020.

"My Oh My" peaked at number six in Ireland, and charted in the top 20 in various other countries including Australia, Belgium, Finland, Greece, the Netherlands, New Zealand, and Singapore. In the United Kingdom, the track reached number 13, earning Cabello her eighth top 20 single there. In Brazil, "My Oh My" received a Diamond certification on October 18, 2021, for more than 160,000 copies sold in the country.

== Music video ==
On February 12, 2020, the music video for "My Oh My" was released at 3 pm EST on YouTube, as an old fashioned, Golden-age Hollywood, grayscale-styled video directed by Dave Meyers after it was teased by Cabello on February 5, 2020. Cabello stars as an actress who is tired of always starring as a damsel in distress and wishes to "be the hero". She then goes to a bar and meets an up-and-coming movie director, portrayed by DaBaby, who then hires her to play the role she always wanted. Throughout the video, Cabello utilizes katana in a Kill Bill inspired film titled 'La Bonita Blade', and performs a Grease-style dance, alongside the use of subtitles.

=== Dance video ===
On May 1, 2020, a dance video was released during the COVID-19 pandemic. It featured Cabello and the dancers calling each other through FaceTime before performing the song's dance choreography in each of their homes and parks.

=== Lyric video ===
On January 10, 2020, an animated lyric video was released online. As of May 2020, it had over 18 million views on YouTube.

=== Accolades ===
Awards and nominations for "My Oh My" music video
Year	Ceremony	Award	Nominees	Result	Ref.
2020	37th Annual MTV Video Music Awards	Best Cinematography	Cinematographer: Scott Cunningham	Nominated	
2021	25th ADG Excellence in Production Design Award	Short Format: Web Series, Music Video or Commercial	Production Designer: François Audouy: Art Director: A. Todd Holland; Graphic Designer: Ryan Melton, Clint Schultz and Jason Perrine; Concept Illustrator: Landon Lott; Set Decorator: Neil Wyzanowski	Nominated	

== Live performances ==
Cabello and DaBaby performed the song on The Tonight Show Starring Jimmy Fallon on December 12, 2019. Both Cabello and the backup dancers sported lime green and purple high school outfits, with the women wearing cheerleading costumes and the men wearing letterman jackets. During the performance, DaBaby also wore a Gucci sweater. Cabello performed a solo version of the song at the 2020 Global Awards on March 5, 2020. She also performed an acoustic version of the song on the iHeart Living Room Concert for America on March 29, 2020, accompanied by Shawn Mendes playing the acoustic guitar.

== Track listings ==
Digital download
No.	Title	Length
1.	"My Oh My" (featuring DaBaby)	2:51

Digital download – Gunna Remix
No.	Title	Length
1.	"My Oh My" (featuring DaBaby and Gunna)	2:59

== Credits and personnel ==
Credits adapted from the liner notes of Romance.

Publishing

- Published by Sony/ATV Songs LLC (BMI) o/b/o Sony/ATV Music Publishing (UK) LTD/Maidmetal Limited (PRS)/Milamoon Songs (BMI), EMI Blackwood Music Inc. o/b/o EMI Music Publishing LTD (PRS)/MYNY Music (BMI)/Sony/ATV Songs LLC (BMI) o/b/o Sam Fam Beats (BMI), EMI April Music Inc. (ASCAP), MXM admin. by Kobalt (ASCAP), Songs by Universal (BMI)

Recording

- Recorded by Louis Bell at Electric Feel Recording Studios, West Hollywood, California, and by Brian Taylor at Henson Recording Studios, Hollywood, California
- Mixed at Larrabee Studio, North Hollywood, California
- Mastered at the Mastering Palace, New York City, New York
- DaBaby appears courtesy of South Coast Music Group/Interscope Records

Personnel

- Camila Cabello – lead vocals, songwriting
- DaBaby – featured artist, songwriting
- Frank Dukes – production, songwriting
- Louis Bell – miscellaneous production, songwriting, recording
- Ant Clemons – songwriting
- Savan Kotecha – songwriting
- Brian Taylor – recording
- Manny Marroquin – mixing
- Chris Galland – mixing
- Kevin Peterson – mastering
- Alejandro Marambio – songwriting

== Charts ==
=== Weekly charts ===
Weekly chart performance for "My Oh My"
Chart (2019–2020)	Peak position
Argentina Hot 100 (Billboard)	83
Australia (ARIA)	19
Austria (Ö3 Austria Top 40)	38
Belgium (Ultratop 50 Flanders)	31
Belgium (Ultratop 50 Wallonia)	49
Bolivia (Monitor Latino)	14
Canada Hot 100 (Billboard)	13
Canada AC (Billboard)	27
Canada CHR/Top 40 (Billboard)	3
Canada Hot AC (Billboard)	6
Croatia (HRT)	63
Czech Republic Singles Digital (ČNS IFPI)	22
Estonia (Eesti Tipp-40)	20
Finland (Suomen virallinen lista)	17
France (SNEP)	142
Germany (GfK)	53
Greece (IFPI)	11
Hungary (Single Top 40)	21
Hungary (Stream Top 40)	6
Iceland (Tónlistinn)	22
Ireland (IRMA)	6
Israel (Media Forest)	4
Lebanon (OLT20)	16
Lithuania (AGATA)	13
Malaysia (RIM)	19
Mexico Airplay (Billboard)	9
Netherlands (Dutch Top 40)	17
Netherlands (Single Top 100)	15
New Zealand (Recorded Music NZ)	15
Norway (VG-lista)	23
Poland Airplay (ZPAV)	9
Portugal (AFP)	51
Scottish Singles Sales (Official Charts)	23
Singapore (RIAS)	14
Slovakia Singles Digital (ČNS IFPI)	27
Sweden (Sverigetopplistan)	46
Switzerland (Schweizer Hitparade)	37
UK Singles (Official Charts)	13
US Billboard Hot 100	12
US Adult Contemporary (Billboard)	17
US Adult Pop Airplay (Billboard)	6
US Dance Airplay (Billboard)	10
US Pop Airplay (Billboard)	1
US Rhythmic Airplay (Billboard)	18
US Rolling Stone Top 100	23
Venezuela Anglo (Record Report)	6
Venezuela Pop (Record Report)	20

=== Year-end charts ===
Year-end chart performance for "My Oh My" in 2020
Chart (2020)	Position
Belgium (Ultratop Flanders)	97
Canada (Canadian Hot 100)	26
Hungary (Stream Top 40)	58
Netherlands (Dutch Top 40)	84
Poland (ZPAV)	79
UK Singles (OCC)	88
US Billboard Hot 100	37
US Adult Top 40 (Billboard)	22
US Dance/Mix Show Airplay (Billboard)	25
US Mainstream Top 40 (Billboard)	13

== Certifications ==
Certifications and sales for "My Oh My"
Region	Certification	Certified units/sales
Australia (ARIA)	Platinum	70,000^{‡}
Austria (IFPI Austria)	Gold	15,000^{‡}
Brazil (Pro-Música Brasil)	Diamond	160,000^{‡}
Canada (Music Canada)	3× Platinum	240,000^{‡}
Denmark (IFPI Danmark)	Gold	45,000^{‡}
France (SNEP)	Gold	100,000^{‡}
Italy (FIMI)	Gold	50,000^{‡}
Mexico (AMPROFON)	Gold	30,000^{‡}
New Zealand (RMNZ)	2× Platinum	60,000^{‡}
Norway (IFPI Norway)	Gold	30,000^{‡}
Poland (ZPAV)	Platinum	50,000^{‡}
Portugal (AFP)	Gold	5,000^{‡}
Spain (Promusicae)	Gold	30,000^{‡}
Switzerland (IFPI Switzerland)	Gold	10,000^{‡}
United Kingdom (BPI)	Platinum	600,000^{‡}
United States (RIAA)	2× Platinum	2,000,000^{‡}
Streaming
Sweden (GLF)	Gold	4,000,000^{†}
^{‡} Sales+streaming figures based on certification alone.^{†} Streaming-only figures based on certification alone.

== Release history ==
Release dates and formats for "My Oh My"
Region	Date	Format	Version	Label	Ref.
Various	December 6, 2019	Digital download; streaming	Main	Epic; Syco	
United States	January 6, 2020	Hot/Modern/AC radio	Radio edit - no rap	Epic	
United States	January 7, 2020	Contemporary hit radio	Radio edit	Epic	
United Kingdom	January 10, 2020	Contemporary hit radio	Radio edit	Syco	
Italy	February 28, 2020	Contemporary hit radio	Radio edit	Sony	
Various	May 1, 2020	Digital download; streaming	Gunna remix	Epic; Syco	
Canada	May 1, 2020	Adult contemporary radio	Gunna remix	Sony Music Canada	
Canada	May 1, 2020	Contemporary hit radio	Gunna remix	Sony Music Canada	
