= Camila Cabello discography =

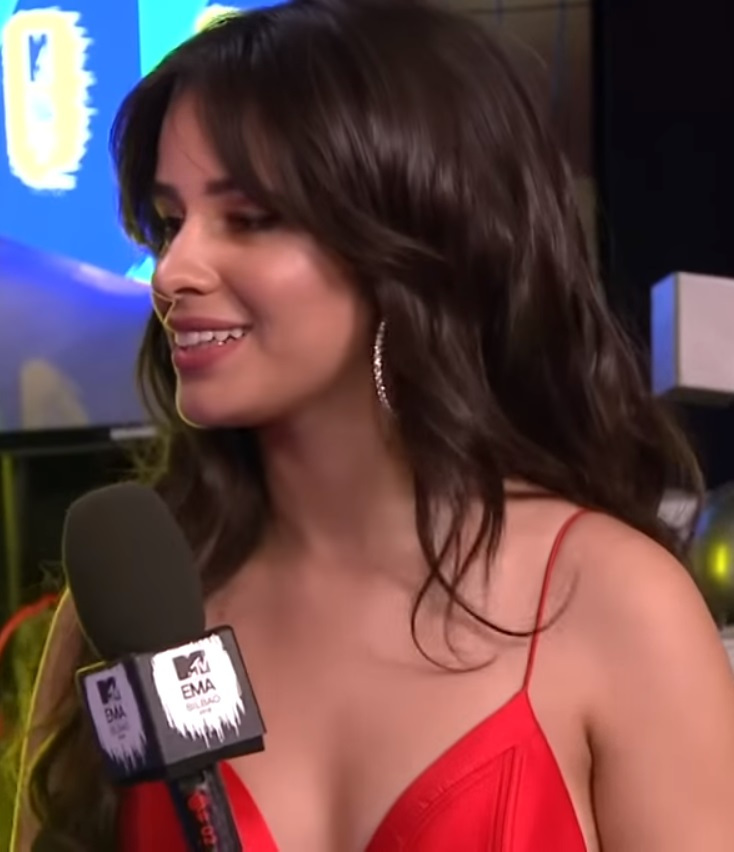
- Cabello at the MTV EMAs, November 2018
- Studio albums: 4
- Soundtrack albums: 1
- Live albums: 2
- Singles: 34
- Music videos: 27
- Promotional singles: 5

American singer Camila Cabello has released four studio albums, two live albums, one soundtrack album, 29 singles (including 7 as a featured artist), 5 promotional singles and 34 music videos. According to RIAA, Cabello has sold 45.5 million albums and singles in the United States. Her 2017 smash hit "Havana" is certified diamond in the US, making her the first hispanic female artist to do so. Billboard listed Cabello as the 87th Top Artists of the 2010s, as well as the 33rd Top Social 50 of the Decade. Her debut album Camila placed at No. 142 on Billboard 200 Decade-End Chart, while "Havana" was placed at No. 59 on Billboard Hot 100 Decade-End chart respectively.

Cabello began to establish herself as a solo artist with the release of several collaborations, including "Bad Things" with Machine Gun Kelly, which peaked at number four on the US Billboard Hot 100 in 2016. After leaving musical girl group Fifth Harmony in December 2016, she released the solo single "Crying in the Club" to a modest performance. Refocusing her sound to Latin-influenced music, her eponymous debut studio album Camila (2018) debuted at number one on the US Billboard 200. The album's lead single, "Havana", featuring American rapper Young Thug, became the best-selling digital single of 2018 worldwide according to the International Federation of the Phonographic Industry (IFPI), with equivalent sales of 19 million units globally.

In June 2019, Cabello and Canadian singer Shawn Mendes released their duet "Señorita", from the deluxe edition of Mendes' third studio album. The song became the third best-selling single of 2019 worldwide, with combined sales and track-equivalent streams of 16.1 million units globally. "Senorita" was included on Cabello's second studio album Romance released on December 6, 2019, Romance was supported by "Liar" and "Shameless" and spawned the hit "My Oh My" which peaked at number 12 on the US Billboard Hot 100. Romance peaked at number 3 on the US Billboard 200, and number 1 in Canada.

In July 2021 Cabello released the "Don't Go Yet" the first single from her 3rd studio album Familia. "Don't Go Yet" peaked at number 28 on the Billboard Global 200. Cabello then followed this up in March 2022 with the release of her 2nd single from Familia, "Bam Bam" featuring Ed Sheeran. "Bam Bam" became a global hit, peaking at number 5 on the Billboard Global 200, and number 21 on the US Billboard Hot 100. Familia was released on April 8, 2022, peaking at number 10 on the US Billboard 200, number 6 in Canada, number 9 in the UK and number 4 in Spain.

== Albums ==
=== Studio albums ===
List of studio albums, with selected details, chart positions, sales figures and certifications
Title	Details	Peak chart positions										Sales	Certifications
Title	Details	US	AUS	CAN	FRA	GER	IRE	ITA	NZ	SWE	UK	Sales	Certifications
Camila	Released: January 12, 2018; Label: Epic, Syco; Format: CD, LP, digital download, streaming	1	3	1	7	8	3	8	3	1	2	US: 149,545; UK: 125,000	RIAA: Platinum; ARIA: Gold; BPI: Gold; FIMI: Gold; IFPI SWE: Gold; MC: 2× Platinum; RMNZ: 3× Platinum; SNEP: Platinum
Romance	Released: December 6, 2019; Label: Epic, Syco; Format: CD, LP, digital download, streaming, cassette, box set	3	6	1	53	55	12	44	7	23	14	US: 54,000	RIAA: Platinum; BPI: Gold; MC: 2× Platinum; RMNZ: 2× Platinum; SNEP: Gold
Familia	Released: April 8, 2022; Label: Epic; Format: CD, LP, digital download, streaming	10	27	6	43	27	36	19	26	19	9	US: 11,500	FIMI: Gold; MC: Gold; RMNZ: Gold; SNEP: Gold
C,XOXO	Released: June 28, 2024; Label: Geffen, Interscope; Format: CD, LP, digital download, streaming	13	29	20	54	20	57	61	25	—	20		
"—" denotes a recording that did not chart or was not released in that territory.

=== Live albums ===
List of live albums and selected details
Title	Details
New Music Daily Presents: Camila Cabello	Released: December 20, 2019; Format: Digital download, streaming; Label: Epic, Syco
Apple Music Live: Camila Cabello	Released: September 4, 2024; Format: Digital download, streaming; Label: Geffen, Interscope

=== Soundtrack albums ===
List of soundtrack albums, with selected details and chart positions
Title	Album details	Peak chart positions			
Title	Album details	US	AUS	SPA	UK DL
Cinderella	Released: September 3, 2021; Format: CD, digital download, streaming; Label: Epic, Columbia, Sony Music	127	86	94	14

== Singles ==
=== As lead artist ===
List of singles as lead artist, showing year released, with selected chart positions, certifications and album name
Title	Year	Peak chart positions										Certifications	Album
Title	Year	US	AUS	CAN	DEN	GER	IRE	ITA	NZ	SWE	UK	Certifications	Album
"I Know What You Did Last Summer" (with Shawn Mendes)	2015	20	33	19	21	90	42	53	— (Note: "I Know What You Did Last Summer" did not enter the NZ Top 40 Singles Chart, but peaked at number one on the NZ Heatseeker Singles Chart.)	24	42	RIAA: 3× Platinum; ARIA: 2× Platinum; BPI: Platinum; FIMI: Gold; IFPI DEN: Platinum; IFPI SWE: Platinum; MC: 5× Platinum; RMNZ: 2× Platinum	Handwritten Revisited
"Bad Things" (with Machine Gun Kelly)	2016	4	22	11	—	58	21	47	11	36	16	RIAA: 5× Platinum; ARIA: 4× Platinum; BPI: Platinum; FIMI: Gold; RMNZ: 2× Platinum	Bloom
"Crying in the Club"	2017	47	39	31	—	49	17	62	— (Note: "Crying in the Club" did not enter the NZ Top 40 Singles Chart, but peaked at number two on the NZ Heatseeker Singles Chart.)	58	12	RIAA: Platinum; ARIA: Platinum; BPI: Platinum; BVMI: Gold; FIMI: Platinum; IFPI DEN: Gold; IFPI SWE: Gold; MC: 2× Platinum; RMNZ: Platinum	Non-album single
"Havana" (featuring Young Thug or remix with Daddy Yankee)	2017	1	1	1	2	2	1	2	2	4	1	RIAA: Diamond; ARIA: 10× Platinum; BPI: 5× Platinum; BVMI: Diamond; FIMI: 4× Platinum; IFPI DEN: 3× Platinum; IFPI SWE: 5× Platinum; MC: Diamond; RMNZ: 7× Platinum	Camila
"Never Be the Same" (solo or featuring Kane Brown)	2017	6	7	19	34	30	6	85	8	39	7	RIAA: 4× Platinum; ARIA: 3× Platinum; BPI: Platinum; BVMI: Gold; FIMI: Gold; IFPI DEN: Gold; IFPI SWE: Gold; MC: 4× Platinum; RMNZ: 3× Platinum	Camila
"Sangria Wine" (with Pharrell Williams)	2018	83	—	88	—	—	76	—	— (Note: "Sangria Wine" did not enter the NZ Top 40 Singles Chart, but peaked at number seven on the NZ Heatseeker Singles Chart.)	— (Note: "Sangria Wine" did not enter the Swedish Singellista Chart, but peaked at number two on the Swedish Heatseeker Chart.)	84		Non-album single
"Consequences" (original or orchestral version)	2018	51	—	75	—	—	52	—	— (Note: "Consequences" did not enter the NZ Top 40 Singles Chart, but peaked at number 16 on the NZ Hot Singles Chart.)	—	—	RIAA: Platinum; BPI: Silver; MC: Platinum; RMNZ: Gold	Camila
"Mi Persona Favorita" (with Alejandro Sanz)	2019	—	—	—	—	—	—	—	—	—	—	RIAA: Gold (Latin)	El Disco
"Señorita" (with Shawn Mendes)	2019	1	1	1	1	1	1	1	1	1	1	RIAA: 5× Platinum; ARIA: 10× Platinum; BPI: 4× Platinum; BVMI: 3× Gold; FIMI: 4× Platinum; IFPI DEN: 4× Platinum; IFPI SWE: 2× Platinum; MC: Diamond; RMNZ: 6× Platinum	Shawn Mendes and Romance
"Shameless"	2019	60	62	40	—	95	36	—	— (Note: "Shameless" did not enter the NZ Top 40 Singles Chart, but peaked at number 12 on the NZ Hot Singles Chart.)	— (Note: "Shameless" did not enter the Swedish Singellista Chart, but peaked at number 16 on the Swedish Heatseeker Chart.)	50	RIAA: Gold; BPI: Gold; BVMI: Gold; IFPI DEN: Gold; MC: Gold; RMNZ: Platinum	Romance
"Liar"	2019	52	31	27	—	63	17	—	32	58	21	RIAA: Platinum; ARIA: Platinum; BPI: Gold; FIMI: Gold; IFPI DEN: Gold; IFPI SWE: Gold; MC: Platinum; RMNZ: Platinum	Romance
"Cry for Me"	2019	— (Note: "Cry for Me" did not enter the Billboard Hot 100, but peaked at number 15 on the Billboard Bubbling Under Hot 100 chart.)	—	81	—	—	57	—	—	95	85		Romance
"Easy"	2019	— (Note: "Easy" did not enter the Billboard Hot 100, but peaked at number 10 on the Billboard Bubbling Under Hot 100 chart.)	76	82	—	—	67	—	— (Note: "Easy" did not enter the NZ Heatseeker Singles Chart, but peaked at number eight on the NZ Hot Singles Chart.)	— (Note: "Easy" did not enter the Swedish Singellista Chart, but peaked at number 11 on the Swedish Heatseeker Chart.)	86		Romance
"Living Proof"	2019	—	—	84	—	—	82	—	— (Note: "Living Proof" did not enter the NZ Top 40 Singles Chart, but peaked at number 10 on the NZ Hot Singles Chart.)	—	—		Romance
"My Oh My" (featuring DaBaby, or DaBaby and Gunna)	2020	12	19	13	—	53	6	—	15	39	13	RIAA: 2× Platinum; ARIA: Platinum; BPI: Platinum; FIMI: Gold; IFPI DEN: Gold; IFPI SWE: Gold; MC: 3× Platinum; RMNZ: 2× Platinum	Romance
"Don't Go Yet"	2021	41	37	42	43	25	35	51	24	51	37	BPI: Gold; FIMI: Platinum; IFPI DEN: Gold; MC: Platinum; RMNZ: Gold	Familia
"Oh Na Na" (with Myke Towers and Tainy)	2021	— (Note: "Oh Na Na" did not enter the Billboard Hot 100, but peaked at number 20 on the Hot Latin Songs chart.)	—	—	—	—	—	—	— (Note: "Oh Na Na" did not enter the NZ Top 40 Singles Chart, but peaked at number 29 on the NZ Hot Singles Chart.)	—	—		Non-album single
"Bam Bam" (featuring Ed Sheeran)	2022	21	11	4	11	12	4	12	21	29	7	RIAA: Platinum; ARIA: Platinum; BPI: Platinum; FIMI: 2× Platinum; IFPI DEN: Platinum; IFPI SWE: Platinum; MC: 3× Platinum; RMNZ: Platinum	Familia
"Psychofreak" (featuring Willow)	2022	75	—	41	—	—	49	—	— (Note: "Psychofreak" did not enter the NZ Top 40 Singles Chart, but peaked at number five on the NZ Hot Singles Chart.)	85	73		Familia
"Hasta los Dientes" (with María Becerra)	2022	—	—	—	—	—	—	—	—	—	—		Familia
"Mon amour" (with Stromae)	2022	—	—	—	—	—	—	—	—	—	—		Multitude
"Ku Lo Sa" (with Oxlade)	2022	—	—	—	—	—	—	—	—	—	—		Non-album single
"I Luv It" (with Playboi Carti)	2024	81	—	66	—	—	47	—	— (Note: "I Luv It" did not enter the NZ Top 40 Singles Chart, but peaked at number nine on the NZ Hot Singles Chart.)	— (Note: "I Luv It" did not enter the Swedish Singellista Chart, but peaked at number 20 on the Swedish Heatseeker Chart.)	61	MC: Platinum	C,XOXO (Note: "Godspeed" is only included on the "Magic City" edition of C, XOXO)
"He Knows" (with Lil Nas X)	2024	—	—	—	—	—	—	—	— (Note: "He Knows" did not enter the NZ Top 40 Singles Chart, but peaked at number 19 on the NZ Hot Singles Chart.)	—	—		C,XOXO
"Hot Uptown" (featuring Drake)	2024	62	—	42	—	—	—	—	— (Note: "Hot Uptown" did not enter the NZ Top 40 Singles Chart, but peaked at number nine on the NZ Hot Singles Chart.)	— (Note: "Hot Uptown" did not enter the Swedish Singellista Chart, but peaked at number four on the Swedish Heatseeker Chart.)	86		C,XOXO
"Godspeed"	2024	—	—	—	—	—	—	—	—	—	—		C,XOXO
"Move" (Remix with Adam Port and Stryv featuring Keinemusik, Malachiii and Orso)	2024	—	—	—	—	—	—	—	—	—	—		Non-album single
"—" denotes a recording that did not chart or was not released in that territory.

=== As featured artist ===
List of singles as featured artist, showing year released, with selected chart positions, certifications and album name
Title	Year	Peak chart positions										Certifications	Album
Title	Year	US	AUS	CAN	DEN	GER	IRE	ITA	NZ	SWE	UK	Certifications	Album
"Love Incredible" (Cashmere Cat featuring Camila Cabello)	2017	—	—	—	—	—	—	—	— (Note: "Love Incredible" did not enter the NZ Top 40 Singles Chart, but peaked at number 5 on the NZ Heatseeker Singles Chart.)	—	—		9
"Hey Ma" (Pitbull and J Balvin featuring Camila Cabello)	2017	— (Note: "Hey Ma" did not enter the Billboard Hot 100, but peaked at number 8 on the Billboard Bubbling Under Hot 100 chart.)	—	95	—	64	—	49	—	— (Note: "Hey Ma" did not enter the Sverigetopplistan singles chart, but peaked at number 11 on the Sverigetopplistan Heatseeker chart.)	—	RIAA: Gold; FIMI: Platinum	The Fate of the Furious: The Album
"Know No Better" (Major Lazer featuring Travis Scott, Camila Cabello and Quavo)	2017	87	34	30	21	40	19	47	20	30	15	RIAA: Gold; ARIA: 2× Platinum; BPI: Platinum; FIMI: Platinum; IFPI DEN: Gold; RMNZ: 2× Platinum	Know No Better
"Almost Like Praying" (as part of Artists for Puerto Rico)	2017	20	—	—	—	—	—	—	—	—	—		Non-album singles
"Beautiful" (Bazzi featuring Camila Cabello)	2018	26	52	35	—	79	19	—	23	68	33	RIAA: 4× Platinum; ARIA: 3× Platinum; BPI: Gold; MC: 4× Platinum; RMNZ: 3× Platinum	Non-album singles
"Find U Again" (Mark Ronson featuring Camila Cabello)	2019	— (Note: "Find U Again" did not enter the Billboard Hot 100, but peaked at number 2 on the Billboard Bubbling Under Hot 100 chart.)	53	67	—	—	24	—	— (Note: "Find U Again" did not enter the NZ Top 40 Singles Chart, but peaked at number four on the NZ Hot Singles Chart.)	— (Note: "Find U Again" did not enter the Swedish Singellista Chart, but peaked at number six on the Swedish Heatseeker Chart.)	27	ARIA: Platinum; BPI: Silver; MC: Gold; RMNZ: Gold	Late Night Feelings
"South of the Border" (Ed Sheeran featuring Camila Cabello and Cardi B)	2019	49	12	14	18	33	10	52	14	14	4	RIAA: Gold; ARIA: 4× Platinum; BPI: 2× Platinum; BVMI: Gold; FIMI: Platinum; IFPI DEN: 2× Platinum; MC: 6× Platinum; RMNZ: 4× Platinum	No.6 Collaborations Project
"—" denotes a recording that did not chart or was not released in that territory.

=== Promotional singles ===
List of promotional singles, showing year released, with selected chart positions, certifications and album name
Title	Year	Peak chart positions										Certifications	Album
Title	Year	US	AUS	CAN	DEN	FRA	IRE	NLD	NZ Heat.	POR	UK	Certifications	Album
"I Have Questions" (Note: "I Have Questions" and "Havana (Remix)" are featured as bonus tracks on the Japanese limited edition of Camila.)	2017	— (Note: "I Have Questions" did not enter the Billboard Hot 100, but peaked at number 24 on the Billboard Bubbling Under Hot 100 Singles chart.)	—	—	—	94	—	—	—	82	—	RIAA: Gold; MC: Gold	Non-album promotional singles
"OMG" (featuring Quavo)	2017	81	77	53	—	179	—	20	1	65	67	ARIA: Gold; MC: Platinum; RMNZ: Gold	Non-album promotional singles
"Real Friends" (Note: The original version of "Real Friends" appears on the Camila album; the reimagined version was released and charted separately.)	2017	— (Note: The original version of "Real Friends" did not enter the Billboard Hot 100, but peaked at number 6 on the Bubbling Under Hot 100 Singles chart.)	86	60	32	137	39	64	3	32	—	RIAA: Platinum; ARIA: Gold; BPI: Silver; IFPI DEN: Gold; MC: 2× Platinum; RMNZ: Platinum	Camila
"First Man"	2020	94	—	—	—	—	—	—	— (Note: "First Man" did not enter the NZ Top 40 Singles Chart, but peaked at number 34 on the NZ Hot Singles Chart.)	—	—		Romance
"Million to One"	2021	—	—	—	—	—	—	—	32	—	—		Cinderella
"It Takes Two" (with Anna Kendrick, Justin Timberlake, Eric André, Daveed Diggs and Kid Cudi)	2023	—	—	—	—	—	—	—	—	—	—		Trolls Band Together
"Chanel No. 5"	2024	—	—	—	—	—	—	—	—	—	—		C,XOXO
"—" denotes a recording that did not chart or was not released in that territory.

== Other charted songs ==
List of other charted songs, showing year released, with selected chart positions, certifications and album name
Title	Year	Peak chart positions								Certifications	Album
Title	Year	US	CAN	IRE	ITA	NZ	POR	SWE	UK	Certifications	Album
"All These Years"	2018	—	—	56	—	—	69	—	—		Camila
"She Loves Control"	2018	—	77	37	—	— (Note: "She Loves Control" did not enter the NZ Top 40 Singles Chart, but peaked at number 1 on the NZ Heatseeker Singles Chart.)	52	77	40	RIAA: Gold; BPI: Silver; MC: Platinum; RMNZ: Gold	Camila
"Inside Out"	2018	—	—	—	—	—	92	—	—		Camila
"Something's Gotta Give"	2018	—	—	95	—	—	72	—	—		Camila
"In the Dark"	2018	—	—	100	—	—	89	—	—		Camila
"Into It"	2018	—	75	—	—	—	88	—	—		Camila
"Should've Said It"	2019	—	—	—	—	— (Note: "Should've Said It" did not enter the NZ Top 40 Singles Chart, but peaked at number 22 on the NZ Hot Singles Chart.)	—	—	—		Romance
"Bad Kind of Butterflies"	2019	—	—	—	—	— (Note: "Bad Kind of Butterflies" did not enter the NZ Top 40 Singles Chart, but peaked at number 31 on the NZ Hot Singles Chart.)	—	—	—		Romance
"This Love"	2019	—	—	—	—	— (Note: "This Love" did not enter the NZ Top 40 Singles Chart, but peaked at number 30 on the NZ Hot Singles Chart.)	—	—	—		Romance
"Rockin' Around the Christmas Tree" (Kacey Musgraves featuring Camila Cabello)	2019	— (Note: "Rockin' Around the Christmas Tree" did not enter the Billboard Hot 100, but peaked at number 13 on the Billboard Bubbling Under Hot 100 chart.)	—	—	—	—	—	—	—		The Kacey Musgraves Christmas Show
"The Christmas Song" (with Shawn Mendes)	2020	—	59	—	—	— (Note: "The Christmas Song" did not enter the NZ Top 40 Singles Chart, but peaked at number 16 on the NZ Hot Singles Chart.)	—	96	—		Wonder
"I'll Be Home for Christmas"	2021	71	—	—	92	—	—	—	24		Non-album song
"—" denotes a recording that did not chart or was not released in that territory.

== Guest appearances ==
List of other appearances, showing year released, other artist(s) credited and album name
Title	Year	Other artist(s)	Album
"Crown"	2017	Grey	Bright: The Album
"What a Wonderful World"	2020	Shawn Mendes	One World: Together At Home
"Ambulancia"	2022	Camilo	De Adentro Pa Afuera
"Better Place (Family Harmony)"	2023	Justin Timberlake, Eric André, Daveed Diggs, Kid Cudi, Troye Sivan and Anna Kendrick	Trolls Band Together
"Family"	2023	Justin Timberlake, Anna Kendrick, Eric André, Daveed Diggs, Kid Cudi and Troye Sivan	Trolls Band Together
"Sweet Like Candy"	2026	—N/a	Grand Theft Auto VI: The Album

== Music videos ==
List of music videos, showing year released, other artist(s) credited and director(s)
Title	Year	Other artist(s)	Director(s)	Ref.
As lead artist
"I Know What You Did Last Summer"	2015	Shawn Mendes	Ryan Pallotta	
"Bad Things"	2016	Machine Gun Kelly	Hannah Lux Davis	
"Crying in the Club"	2017	None	Emil Nava	
"Havana"	2017	Young Thug	Dave Meyers	
"Havana" (Vertical video)	2017	Young Thug	Sam Lecca	
"Never Be the Same" (Unofficial video)	2017	None	Rahul Bhatt	
"Never Be the Same"	2018	None	Grant Singer	
"Consequences" (Orchestra)	2018	None	Dave Meyers	
"Consequences" (Orchestra) (Vertical video)	2018	None	None	
"Mi Persona Favorita"	2019	Alejandro Sanz	Gil Green	
"Mi Persona Favorita" (Vertical video)	2019	Alejandro Sanz	Alejandro Sanz; Camila Cabello	
"Señorita"	2019	Shawn Mendes	Dave Meyers	
"Shameless"	2019	None	Henry Scholfield	
"Liar"	2019	None	Dave Meyers	
"Living Proof"	2019	None	Alan Ferguson	
"My Oh My"	2020	DaBaby	Dave Meyers	
"My Oh My" (Quarantine dance video)	2020	DaBaby	Rodney Chonia	
"First Man" (YouTube exclusive video)	2020	None		
"The Christmas Song"	2020	Shawn Mendes	Camila Cabello; Shawn Mendes	
"Don't Go Yet"	2021	None	Philippa Price; Pilar Zeta	
"Million to One"	2021	None	Kay Cannon	
"Bam Bam"	2022	Ed Sheeran	Mia Barnes	
"Psychofreak"	2022	Willow	Charlotte Rutherford	
"Hasta los Dientes"	2022	María Becerra	Charlotte Rutherford	
"Mon amour"	2022	Stromae	Julien & Quentin	
"Ku Lo Sa"	2022	Oxlade	Boma Iluma	
"Ambulancia"	2023	Camilo	Evaluna Montaner	
"I Luv It"	2024	Playboi Carti	Nicolás Méndez	
"He Knows"	2024	Lil Nas X	Onda	
"Chanel No.5"	2024	None	Paul Geusebroek	
"Godspeed"	2024	None	91 Rules	
As featured artist
"Hey Ma" (Spanish Version)	2017	Pitbull and J Balvin	Gil Green	
"Hey Ma"	2017	Pitbull and J Balvin	Gil Green	
"Know No Better"	2017	Major Lazer featuring Travis Scott and Quavo	Philip Andelman	
"Almost Like Praying"	2017	Lin-Manuel Miranda featuring Artists for Puerto Rico	César Camacho; Lin-Manuel Miranda; Luis A. Miranda, Jr.	
"Almost Like Praying" (Salsa Remix)	2018	Lin-Manuel Miranda featuring Artists for Puerto Rico	César Camacho; Lin-Manuel Miranda; Luis A. Miranda, Jr.	
"Beautiful"	2018	Bazzi	Jason Koenig	
"Find U Again"	2019	Mark Ronson	Bradley & Pablo	
"South of the Border"	2019	Ed Sheeran featuring Cardi B	Jason Koenig	
"South of the Border" (Vertical video)	2019	Ed Sheeran featuring Cardi B	Jason Koenig	
Guest appearances
"Girls Like You"	2018	Maroon 5 featuring Cardi B	David Dobkin	
"Girls Like You" (Volume 2)	2018	Maroon 5 featuring Cardi B	David Dobkin	
"La Baby"	2023	Tainy, Daddy Yankee and Feid featuring Sech	Elliot Muscat; Sho Mitsui; Jack Peros; Nick Collini	

== Songwriting credits ==
List of songs written or co-written for other artists, showing year released and album name
Title	Year	Artist	Album
"Be Right Here"	2018	Kungs and Stargate featuring Goldn	Non-album single
"Ain't Easy"	2018	Elijah Woods x Jamie Fine	8:47

== See also ==
- List of songs recorded by Camila Cabello
- List of artists who reached number one in the United States
