= Sangria (disambiguation) =

Sangria is a drink. It may also refer to:

== Books ==
- Sangria: A Recipe for Love, novel by Manuela Requena

== Music ==
- "Sangria" by Blake Shelton
- "Sangria" by Tania Maria Composed by Tania Maria
- "Sweet Sangria" by Tori Amos Composed by Tori Amos
- "Sangria" by IQ
- "Sangria Wine" by Jerry Jeff Walker
- "Sangria Wine" by Pharrell Williams and Camila Cabello

== Other ==
- Another term for exsanguination.
