= OMG (Camila Cabello song) =

Promotional single by Camila Cabello featuring Quavo
- Released: August 3, 2017
- Studio: Westlake (Los Angeles, California)
- Genre: Trap-pop
- Length: 3:48
- Label: Epic
- Songwriters: Camila Cabello; Charlotte Aitchison; Quavo; Noonie Bao; Sasha Sloan; Tor Erik Hermansen; Mikkel Storleer Eriksen
- Producer: Stargate

Camila Cabello promotional singles chronology
"I Have Questions" (2017)	"OMG" (2017)	"Real Friends" (2017)

Audio video
- "OMG" on YouTube

"OMG" is a song by American singer Camila Cabello featuring American rapper Quavo. It was released on August 3, 2017, as a promotional single alongside "Havana". The song was written by the artists, Charli XCX, Noonie Bao, Sasha Sloan, and its producers Stargate. "OMG" has a slow, trap production that is characterized by use of double hi-hat rolls, flute flows and a smooth bass. In the lyrics, Cabello praises the appearance of her love interest while Quavo responds to her affirmation in his verses, where he also added a line from his Migos' song "Bad and Boujee" (2016).

Music critics complimented the track's club-friendly sound while others perceived Cabello's versatility for performing verses written by Charli XCX as well as her dynamic with Quavo. On its first full tracking-week, "OMG" entered the top 100 on charts from several countries, including the US, UK, Scotland, Australia and Portugal. It was most successful in Spain, where it reached a peak of 16, spending two consecutive weeks on chart. In Canada, "OMG" received a platinum certification for 80,000 copies sold in the country.

== Background and release ==
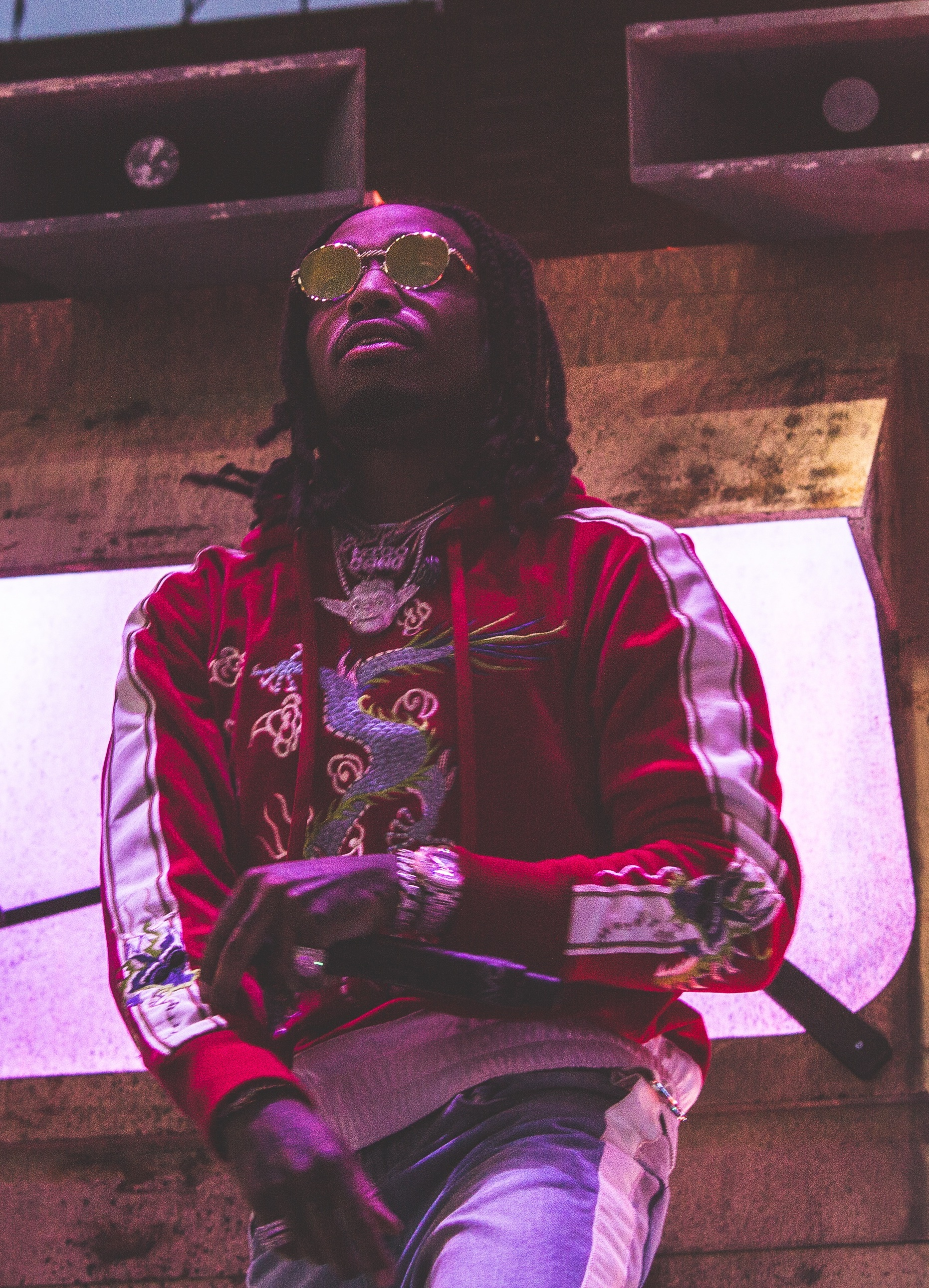
The rapper Quavo (pictured in 2017) appeared as a featuring artist on the song.

In December 2016, Cabello departed from the girl group Fifth Harmony to focus on her solo career. She started the recording sessions for her solo debut studio album in early 2017. She said that the album would be classified in a very personal level where she could explore her own experiences, and initially named it The Hurting. The Healing. The Loving. She wanted the album to tell "the story of [her] journey from darkness into light, from a time when she was lost to a time when she found herself again". To achieve her desired sound, Cabello collaborated with some notable producers, including the Norwegian production duo Stargate–composed by Tor Erik Hermansen and Mikkel Storleer Eriksen.

During sessions with Stargate, Cabello met the British singer Charli XCX who helped her to brainstorm ideas for the lyrics. Together, they created some "emotional" and "deep" records like "Scar Tissues" to match the "Hurting" concept planned for the album, although while talking to Charli XCX, Cabello had the idea to write something that was just "fun" and "not really take[n] too seriously". "OMG" was recorded at Westlake Recording Studios in Los Angeles and later mixed by Serban Ghenea at Mixstar Studios, Virginia Beach. It features a guest appearance by rapper Quavo who is also credited as one of the track's writers.

Prior to its release, Cabello debuted the song during her performance at Chicago's B96 Pepsi SummerBash on June 25, 2017. She also worked as an opening act for Bruno Mars on his 24K Magic World Tour from July 20 to August 22; during the shows, she performed "OMG" and other then-unreleased tracks such as "Havana", "Inside Out" and "Never Be the Same". On July 30, she announced a "Summer Double Feature" release in a picture posted on her Twitter account, where she revealed a release date for "OMG" and "Havana", both released simultaneously as promotional singles on August 3. The song was originally intended to be on her debut album; however, after changing the name of the album to Camila, she revealed that "OMG" was ultimately removed from the final track list.

== Composition ==
"OMG" is a hip hop-inspired song; it comprises a trap drum beat with hi-hat rolls, flute flows and atmospheric bass beneath a "smooth", rap-like croon from Cabello and Quavo with auto-tuned effects. Its chorus was described as "appealing" by Chris DeVille from Stereogum, in which Cabello sings, "Oh my God! You look good today", with Quavo responding on the background. In the verses, Cabello mentions being from Miami and "causing trouble in L.A", while appreciating the physicality of her love interest. Quavo similarly raps about his intentions with a woman he is in love with, while making references to the Migos' 2016 single "Bad and Boujee". In an interview with Zane Lowe on Beats 1, she explained: "I just wanted to create a song of my own, that wasn't that deep, that was just fun and confident. Also like role reversal, when we were writing it we wrote it as this girl squad anthem about just pulling up to the boys and just having that swagger."

== Critical reception ==
Nick Maslow of Entertainment Weekly described the song as an "attitude-filled club-banger". Praising Charli XCX's songwriting, Ross McNeilage of MTV UK felt that her "bold energy" can definitely be heard in the performer's verses, and considered the track a "cocky trap-pop banger for the clubs". Much's Allison Browsher thought the "sexy tune" is "perfect for anyone looking for a sultry pump up track". Writing for XXL, Peter Berry commented that Cabello's verse contains "quick-fire flexes and a cadence" not unlike that of Quavo, sounding like as if they could have been written by Quavo himself. Other critics responded moderately to "OMG". Mike Wass from Idolator, who regarded it as a "basic banger" in comparison to "Havana", while Arielle Tschinker from the same publication classified it as a "decent slow jam", although she perceived a lack of "sparkle and attitude" that Cabello had with Fifth Harmony.

== Commercial performance ==
"OMG" debuted at number 81 on the Billboard Hot 100 on August 27, 2017, along with "Havana" which entered at number 99. It gave Cabello her fifth and sixth solo entries on the component chart. That same week, "OMG" started at 19 on Digital Songs chart, selling 20,000 digital downloads on its first full tracking-week as reported by Billboard. In Canada, "OMG" reached 53 on the Canadian Hot 100; it was later certified gold by the Music Canada association on May 30, 2018, denoting shipments of 80,000 copies. The song also entered the charts in European countries with numbers done on its first week, debuting inside top 100 in two Official Charts components, the UK Singles Charts, where it debuted at its peak position of number 67 and peaked at 31 on Official Scottish Singles Charts. It achieved its highest position in Spain where it debuted at 16 and spent two consecutive weeks on charts.

== Credits and personnel ==
Credits were adapted from Tidal.

=== Recording and management ===
- Recorded at Westlake Recording Studios (Los Angeles, California)
- Mixed at MixStar Studios (Virginia Beach, Virginia)
- Mastered at Sterling Sound (New York City, New York)
- Published by Sony/ATV Songs LLC (BMI) and EMI April Music Inc. (ASCAP)
- Quavo appears courtesy of 300 Entertainment and Atlantic Records

=== Personnel ===
- Camila Cabello – lead vocals, songwriting
- Quavo – guest vocals, songwriting
- Stargate – songwriting, production
- Charli XCX – songwriting
- Noonie Bao – songwriting
- Sasha Sloan – songwriting
- Serban Ghenea – mixing
- John Hanes – mixing, engineering
- Chris Gehringer – mastering

== Charts ==
Weekly chart performance
Chart (2017)	Peak position
Australia (ARIA)	77
Canada Hot 100 (Billboard)	53
Czech Republic Singles Digital (ČNS IFPI)	73
France Downloads (SNEP)	179
Netherlands (Single Tip)	22
New Zealand Heatseekers (RMNZ)	1
Portugal (AFP)	65
Scottish Singles Sales (Official Charts)	37
Slovakia Singles Digital (ČNS IFPI)	56
UK Singles (Official Charts)	67
US Billboard Hot 100	81

== Certifications ==
List of certifications and sales
Region	Certification	Certified units/sales
Australia (ARIA)	Gold	35,000^{‡}
Brazil (Pro-Música Brasil)	Platinum	60,000^{‡}
Canada (Music Canada)	Platinum	80,000^{‡}
Mexico (AMPROFON)	Gold	30,000^{‡}
New Zealand (RMNZ)	Gold	15,000^{‡}
^{‡} Sales+streaming figures based on certification alone.
