= Real Friends (Camila Cabello song) =

2018 single by Camila Cabello featuring Swae Lee

Promotional single by Camila Cabello

from the album Camila
- Released: December 7, 2017
- Studio: Electric Feel (West Hollywood, California)
- Genre: Pop
- Length: 3:34
- Label: Epic; Syco
- Songwriters: Camila Cabello; Adam Feeney; William Walsh; Louis Bell; Brian Lee
- Producer: Frank Dukes

Camila Cabello promotional singles chronology
"OMG" (2017)	"Real Friends" (2017)	"Million to One" (2021)

"Real Friends" is a song by American singer and songwriter Camila Cabello from her debut studio album Camila (2018). It was released as a promotional single alongside "Never Be the Same" on December 7, 2017. Written by Cabello, William Walsh, Louis Bell, Brian Lee and its producer, Frank Dukes. "Real Friends" has an acoustic guitar foundation. In its lyrics, Cabello reflects on her life and asks for an honest friendship. The song's minimalist production has elements of reggae, Latin and tropical music. The reimagined version of the song featuring American musician Swae Lee was released on August 16, 2018.

"Real Friends" was inspired by Cabello's dissatisfaction and loneliness from work-focused life in Los Angeles while she was finishing recording Camila. Music critics praised its acoustic sound and Cabello's vocals. "Real Friends" debuted in the top 100 of several countries, including Canada, the Netherlands, Portugal, Spain, Belgium and Ireland. Although it did not chart on the US Billboard Hot 100, it debuted at number six on the Bubbling Under Hot 100 chart.

== Background and release ==
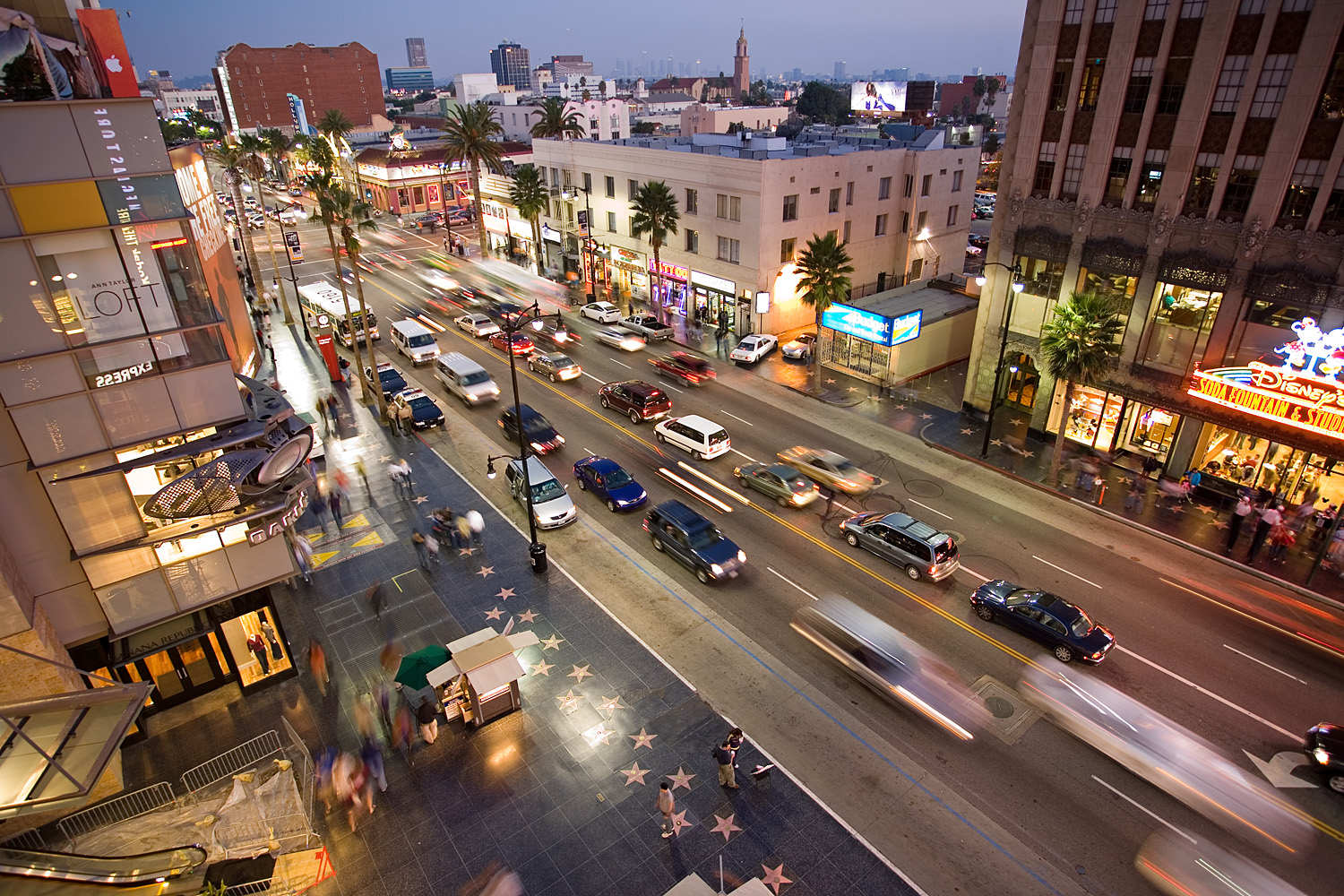
Cabello wrote "Real Friends" in Los Angeles (Hollywood Boulevard is pictured), reflecting on her life while annoyed by the city's environment.

"Real Friends" was written by Cabello, Frank Dukes, William Walsh, Louis Bell and Brian Lee, while production was handled by Dukes. Cabello was motivated to write the song when she was in Los Angeles finishing her debut solo album, Camila (2018). Dissatisfied with the city and its industrial environment, she found herself lonely and disappointed – prioritising work, without a social life.

"Real Friends", the last song created for the album, was recorded at Electric Feel Recording Studios in West Hollywood by Louis Bell and mixed at MixStar Studios in Virginia Beach, Virginia by Serban Ghenea and John Hanes. The song was released a week after its recording with "Never Be the Same" on December 7, 2017, as an instant-gratification track to accompany digital pre-orders of Camila.

== Composition ==
"Real Friends"
A 46-second sample of "Real Friends", in which Cabello sings the chorus over an acoustic guitar with a solo handclap as percussion.

"Real Friends" is a pop and low-key song, characterized by a minimalist production with an acoustic guitar as the main instrument and a solo pop handclap as percussion. The verses are sung gently, with Cabello using her low register instead of her soprano voice. In the lyrics, she reflects on being surrounded by negative things and people, while asking for an honest friendship. In the chorus, Cabello sings: "I'm just lookin' for some real friends / All they ever do is let me down / Every time I let somebody in / Then I find out what they're all about". According to Mike Nied of Idolator, the singer "laments her ability to find true companionship over acoustic strings".

Lasting three minutes and 33 seconds, the song is influenced by tropical, reggae and Latin music. According to sheet music published by Sony/ATV Music Publishing on Musicnotes.com, "Real Friends" is composed in the key of C minor and set in common time at a moderate tempo of 92 beats per minute. Cabello's voice ranges from a low of B♭_{3} to a high of C_{5}, and the music has a Cm^{7}–Fm^{7}–B♭–E♭/D chord progression.

== Reception ==
=== Critical response ===
"Real Friends" received media attention for its lyrics, which were speculated to be about Cabello's relationship with her former girl group Fifth Harmony. Cabello denied that speculation in an Access interview, saying that the song did not refer to anyone in particular but was about her lonely experience in Los Angeles while she was recording the album.

Alex Petridis of The Guardian felt that the lyrics explored "nights spent feeling isolated while on tour". Elias Leight of Rolling Stone called "Real Friends" Cabello's sparest song in comparison with her past work. Variety described it as a "gentle, sparsely arranged ballad" that resembles "Love Yourself" (2015) by Canadian singer Justin Bieber. Jamieson Cox of Pitchfork complimented the softness of the track and Cabello singing "with real delicacy". Sam Lansky of Time cited the song and the "heartfelt" track, "Consequences", as "pretty" ballads which showcased Cabello's voice.

=== Chart performance ===
"Real Friends" debuted in the top 100 in Canada, the Netherlands, Scotland, Slovakia and Australia, while reaching the top 40 in Portugal, Denmark, Ireland and Belgium. The song did not charted on the Billboard Hot 100 in the United States, but it debuted at number six on the Bubbling Under Hot 100.

== Credits and personnel ==
Credits were adapted from the liner notes of Camila.

Publishing

- Published by Sony/ATV Songs LLC (BMI) O/b/O Sony ATV Music Publishing (UK) Ltd./Maidmetal Limited (PRS)/Milamoon Songs (BMI) // EMI April Music, INC. (ASCAP) O/b/O EMI Music Publishing (PRS)/Nyankingmusic (ASCAP) // EMI April Music, INC./Nyankingmusic/WMMW Publishing (ASCAP) // Warner-Temerlane Publishing Corp. (BMI) O/b/O itself and Songs from the Dongs (BMI)

Recording

- Recorded at Electric Feel Recording Studios, West Hollywood, California
- Mixed at MixStar Studios, Virginia Beach, Virginia
- Mastered at the Mastering Palace, New York City, New York

Personnel

- Camila Cabello – songwriting, lead vocals
- Frank Dukes – songwriting, production, guitar
- William Walsh – songwriting
- Vinylz – additional production
- Louis Bell – songwriting, vocals production, recording engineering
- Brian Lee – songwriting, guitar
- Morning Estrada – recording engineering
- Serban Ghenea – mixing
- John Hanes – engineering
- Kevin Peterson – mastering
- Ben Foran – guitar

== Charts ==
Chart performance for "Real Friends"
Chart (2017–2018)	Peak position
Australia (ARIA)	86
Belgium (Ultratip Bubbling Under Flanders)	20
Belgium (Ultratip Bubbling Under Wallonia)	34
Canada Hot 100 (Billboard)	60
Czech Republic Singles Digital (ČNS IFPI)	59
Denmark (Tracklisten)	32
France (SNEP)	137
Hungary (Single Top 40)	37
Hungary (Stream Top 40)	27
Ireland (IRMA)	39
Latvia (DigiTop100)	60
Malaysia (RIM)	15
Netherlands (Single Top 100)	64
New Zealand Heatseekers (RMNZ)	3
Portugal (AFP)	32
Scottish Singles Sales (Official Charts)	88
Slovakia Singles Digital (ČNS IFPI)	58
Spain (PROMUSICAE)	83
Sweden Heatseeker (Sverigetopplistan)	1
US Bubbling Under Hot 100 (Billboard)	6

== Certifications ==
Region	Certification	Certified units/sales
Australia (ARIA)	Gold	35,000^{‡}
Brazil (Pro-Música Brasil)	Platinum	40,000^{‡}
Canada (Music Canada)	2× Platinum	160,000^{‡}
Denmark (IFPI Danmark)	Gold	45,000^{‡}
Mexico (AMPROFON)	Platinum	60,000^{‡}
Norway (IFPI Norway)	Platinum	60,000^{‡}
Poland (ZPAV)	Gold	10,000^{‡}
United States (RIAA)	Platinum	1,000,000^{‡}
^{‡} Sales+streaming figures based on certification alone.

== Release history ==
Release history
Region	Date	Format(s)	Label(s)	Ref.
Various	December 7, 2017 (Note: Released as a promotional single preceding the album Camila's release.)	Digital download; streaming	Epic; Syco	

== Swae Lee reimagined version ==
"Real Friends"

Single by Camila Cabello featuring Swae Lee
- Released: August 16, 2018
- Studio: Electric Feel (West Hollywood, California)
- Length: 3:43
- Label: Epic; Syco
- Songwriters: Camila Cabello; Adam Feeney; Louis Bell; Brian Lee; Swae Lee

Camila Cabello singles chronology
"Beautiful" (2018)	"Real Friends" (2018)	"Consequences" (2018)

Swae Lee singles chronology
"Hopeless Romantic" (2018)	"Real Friends" (2018)	"Sunflower" (2018)

On August 16, 2018, a reimagined version of the song featuring American rapper Swae Lee of Rae Sremmurd was made available worldwide.

=== Background ===
Speaking with Rolling Stone, when asked of all the features he did, does he have a favorite, Swae Lee addressed that:

I decided to work with Camila Cabello [on the reimagined version of "Real Friends"] even though that song went under the radar and they didn't put the right push on it. But I was excited to work with Camila Cabello. I'm a fan of hers. We need to make another one, an original song. I feel like we would make a smash.

— Swae Lee, speech with Rolling Stone about his 2018

=== Chart performance ===
The remix peaked at number 37 in Hungary Single Top 40, number 99 in Ireland and RMNZ's New Zealand Hot Single chart position number 12.

=== Charts ===
Chart (2018)	Peak position
Belgium (Ultratip Bubbling Under Flanders)	4
Hungary (Single Top 40)	37
Ireland (IRMA)	99
New Zealand Hot Singles (RMNZ)	12

=== Certifications ===
Region	Certification	Certified units/sales
New Zealand (RMNZ)	Platinum	30,000^{‡}
United Kingdom (BPI)	Silver	200,000^{‡}
^{‡} Sales+streaming figures based on certification alone.

=== Release history ===
Release history
Region	Date	Format	Label	Ref.
Various	August 16, 2018	Digital download; streaming	Epic; Syco	
