= Camila (album) =

2018 studio album by Camila Cabello

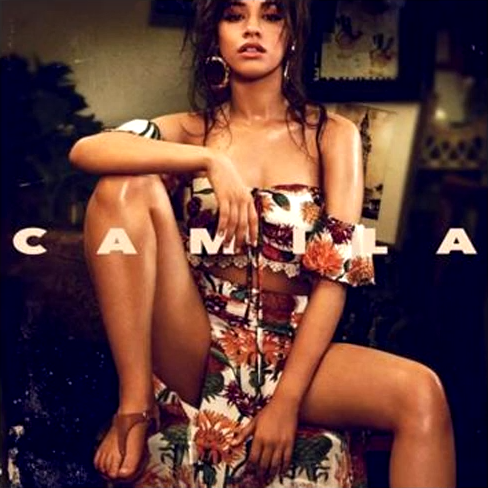

Studio album by Camila Cabello
- Released: January 12, 2018
- Recorded: January–June, November 2017
- Studios: Windmark (Santa Monica); Electric Feel (West Hollywood); NightBird (West Hollywood); TwentyNine Lions (Studio City)
- Genre: Pop
- Length: 36:55
- Languages: English; Spanish
- Labels: Epic; Syco
- Producers: Frank Dukes; Jarami; Louis Bell; Skrillex; Matt Beckley; T-Minus; Bart Schoudel; The Futuristics; SickDrumz; Kuk Harrell; Jesse Shatkin

Camila Cabello chronology
Camila (2018)	Romance (2019)

Singles from Camila
- 1. "Havana" Released: August 3, 2017; 2. "Never Be the Same" Released: December 7, 2017; 3. "Consequences" Released: October 9, 2018

Camila is the debut solo studio album by American singer Camila Cabello. It was released on January 12, 2018, through Epic Records and Syco. Work on the album began in January 2017, following Cabello's departure from the girl group Fifth Harmony. The project was originally titled The Hurting. The Healing. The Loving., with Cabello's debut solo single "Crying in the Club" intended as the lead single. The album was later retitled Camila with "Havana" serving as its official lead single due to the rising success of the song, and "Crying in the Club" was cut from the final track listing. "Havana" became an international success, topping the charts of multiple countries including Australia, Brazil, Canada, France, the UK, and the US, and reaching the top 10 of several others. Primarily a pop record, it also incorporates elements of R&B, Latin, reggaeton, dancehall and hip-hop. Camila was produced by Frank Dukes, Skrillex and T-Minus, among others.

Camila was met with generally positive reviews from contemporary music critics, many of whom commended the Latin influences and ballads. The album debuted at number one on the US Billboard 200 chart, earning 119,000 album-equivalent units, of which 65,000 came from pure album sales. The album sold 5 million copies as of 2019. "Never Be the Same" was released as a single on December 7, 2017, reaching the top 10 in several countries. "Consequences" was released to contemporary hit radio as the album's final single on October 9, 2018, and an orchestra version was serviced to adult contemporary radio in October 22. Cabello promoted the album through televised performances, her Never Be the Same Tour (2018–19), and as an opening act on Taylor Swift's Reputation Stadium Tour (2018). Camila was nominated for Best Pop Vocal Album at the 61st Annual Grammy Awards.

== Background ==
Cabello first rose to fame as a member of girl group Fifth Harmony, formed during the second season of The X Factor in 2012. The group came in third place in the competition, and subsequently signed a recording contract with Syco Music and Epic Records. The group rose to prominence with their breakthrough single "Worth It" (2015), and achieved further success with the US top-ten single "Work from Home" (2016). Fifth Harmony released two studio albums with Cabello in the group, both of which earned gold certifications in the United States. Cabello appeared as a lead artist with Canadian singer Shawn Mendes on his single "I Know What You Did Last Summer" (2015), serving as her first release outside of the group. She next collaborated with Machine Gun Kelly on the song "Bad Things" (2016), which went on to become her first top-ten single as a solo artist. Cabello's solo work led to months of media speculation that she would be leaving Fifth Harmony to focus on a solo music career.

In December 2016, it was officially confirmed that Cabello had parted ways with Fifth Harmony. During an interview with Latina magazine, she commented about her choice and future plans, stating "I needed to follow my heart and my artistic vision. I'm grateful for everything we had in Fifth Harmony and for [this new] opportunity, I am less focused on success and more on doing my best and pursuing my artistic vision to the fullest, wherever that takes me." Her departure from the group was likened to Beyoncé and Justin Timberlake, both of whom rose to fame as part of a group before earning highly successful solo careers.

During the recording of Camila, Cabello was featured in several collaborations. She was featured on the Cashmere Cat single "Love Incredible", as well as the Spanglish "Hey Ma"; the latter was featured on the soundtrack to The Fate of the Furious (2017). She further collaborated with Major Lazer, Travis Scott, and Quavo on the song "Know No Better". The song was a hit in several European territories, most notably the United Kingdom and France. She served as the opening act for Bruno Mars on his 24K Magic World Tour on select dates, performing several songs from her then-unfinished debut effort.

== Recording and development ==
Work on the album officially began in January 2017. Initial recording sessions saw Camila working with a number of well known producers and writers, including Diplo and Pharrell Williams. While none of her collaborations with the former were featured on Camila, the latter is credited as a writer for "Havana". She further collaborated with Andrew "Pop" Wansel on unreleased songs; Wansel said of Cabello "I never underestimated her talent, but I was not expecting her to have such a powerful vision." Cabello wanted the album to tell "the story of my journey from darkness into light, from a time when I was lost to a time when I found myself again." Songs on the album were meant to lyrically deal with the emotions of hurting, healing, and loving. She recorded the song "Crying in the Club" for the album, written by Sia. Cabello wrote additional lyrics for the song, which lyrically deals with the topic of "healing through the power of music." It was produced by Benny Blanco, Cashmere Cat, and Happy Perez. She worked with writer and producer Jesse Shatkin on the song "I Have Questions".

British singer and songwriter Ed Sheeran wrote a demo for a song titled "The Boy" and sent it to Cabello, with Sheeran stating Cabello changed "90%" of the song's lyrics to her liking. He likened the song to "Crazy in Love" by Beyoncé, describing it as "funk-influenced". Cabello also worked on multiple songs with Ryan Tedder. Tedder praised Cabello's songwriting abilities, claiming to be "blown away" by the songs. He told ABC News "The stuff that we've done and that I've heard, they're gonna get stuff that is very, very contemporary and cutting edge but it feels like her. It's got that kind of Cuban spirit to it." The song "Into It", co-written by Tedder, is the only song from the pair to make the album's track list. Cabello additionally confirmed a song titled "Sangria Wine". Production duo Stargate produced "OMG", a hip-hop-influenced song that features rapper Quavo. The song was co-written by Cabello, Quavo, Stargate, Noonie Bao, Alexandra Yatchenko, and pop singer Charli XCX. The latter went on to praise Camila's writing as well, commenting "Such an incredible writer, she just came with everything, I was like 'Why am I here? She is crushing it, she was so next level, like I am so honoured to work with her. I was so stoked." Bao and Yatchenko additionally co-wrote the song "Never Be the Same" for Camila.

Prior to the release of "Crying in the Club", rumors began to circulate of a song titled "A Good Reason to Go", which was set to be released as her lead single. There was speculation that the song would be about her departure from Fifth Harmony, though the rumors were halted when Cabello announced her official first single. The song appears on the album under the title "Something's Gotta Give". That May, Cabello confirmed another song titled "It's Only Natural" for the album. While on the 24K Magic World Tour, she premiered the then-unreleased songs "Havana", "OMG", "Inside Out", and "Never Be the Same". Cabello confirmed the songs would be featured on her debut album. She later announced the songs "Scar Tissue" and "In the Dark" would be featured on the album.

Following the surprise commercial success of "Havana", Cabello confirmed that she had chosen to push back the album's release date in order to record further material. She later confirmed that a lot of the material previously recorded had been scrapped from the final product. She recorded more songs with the album's executive producer Frank Dukes that were influenced by Latin music and contemporary reggaeton, inspired by acts such as Calle 13 and J Balvin. As a result, the album's original concept of hurting, healing, and love was scrapped in favor of the newly recorded material. She later told MTV, "You know, you only have one chance to make a debut album and at this point, I have so many songs I'm passionate about. You know those albums where they are songs that aren't as good as the singles. I want every song to be single-worthy." Cabello worked with Dukes' management company Electric Feel, with Dukes executively producing the album. Work on the album was completed in November 2017.

== Music and lyrics ==
"Frank was a big part of taking a classic part of Latin culture and combining it with something new and modern. Together we made an album that's just reflective of me in every way. It's what's inside my head and my heart."

— Camila Cabello talking on the album's sound.

Primarily a pop record, Camila also incorporates elements of R&B, Latin, reggaeton, dancehall and hip-hop, AllMusic said that Camila is a "warmly produced set of romantic pop" with "several rhythmically infectious Latin-influenced tracks informed by her Cuban heritage."

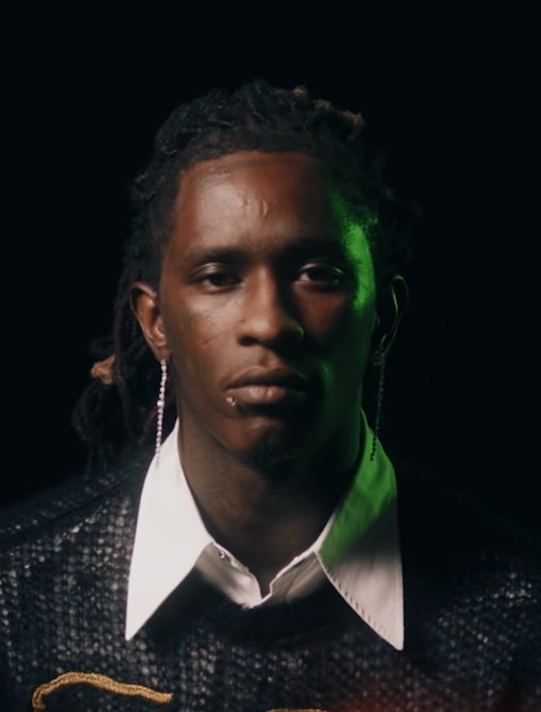
Young Thug (pictured) is the only featured artist on the standard edition of the album.

"Never Be the Same" was described by Billboard as a dark pop ballad. A NME writer described it as "bombastic" electro. Lyrically, it incorporates themes of a pain-is-pleasure type of love. In one part of the song Cabello reaches to a high G_{5} falsetto in the pre-chorus. "All These Years" is a "R&B-tinged" song, Lyrically, it is about an encounter with her ex. "She Loves Control" is an "electronica-tinged, dancehall-ready" track.

"Havana" is a mid-tempo track, containing a mix of "Latin fusion" and pop. It is the only song on the album that features another artist, with a guest appearance by Young Thug. Rolling Stone's Brittany Spanos said it is "clubby, smooth" track, where Cabello sings about falling in love with "a mysterious suitor from East Atlanta", though she has left her heart in her hometown. "Inside Out" is a reggaeton tune that features buoyantly percussive, steel drums. "Consequences" is a piano-led ballad. Lyrically, it's about the impact of a partner that was in her life. It was the album's third and final single on October 9, 2018.

"Real Friends" is a pop ballad that features an acoustic guitar and handclap as percussion. Lyrically, she talks about being surrounded by negative things and people, while asking for an honest friendship. Sam Lansky of Time cited the song and the "heartfelt" track "Consequences" as "pretty" ballads which showcased Cabello's voice. "Somethings Gotta Give" is a ballad. "In the Dark" is a trap-pop song. Lyrically, it is about an unnamed famous boy Camila met at an after-party. "Into It" is a R&B song with a fast tempo. AllMusic called the track "contagious".

== Release and artwork ==
Having signed with Epic Records and Syco Music as a member of Fifth Harmony, it was announced merely days after her departure from the group that Cabello had re-signed with both parties to release her solo work. She announced the album's title as The Hurting. The Healing. The Loving. in May 2017, slated for release that September. She described the project as "the story of my journey from darkness into light, from a time when I was lost to a time when I found myself again." She wrote, "It was a kind of chapter you never want to read out loud", and explained the "whole album-making process" helped her deal with her emotions. When Cabello announced she had pushed back the album's release date to record new material, it was rumored that the album's title would be changed as well. She confirmed in November that the original name and concept of the album had been scrapped and that the project would be released "early next year." Cabello announced on December 5 that the project would be titled Camila, and was set to be released on January 12, 2018. Camila became available for pre-order through digital music providers on December 7.

She revealed the album artwork on her personal Instagram account, and explained the name change stating "I decided to call it by my name, because this is where this chapter in my life ended. It started with somebody else's story, it ended with me finding my way back to myself." The cover for the project sees Camila sitting in a dress and flip flops, with the album's title in bold letters in the center of the cover. Billboard described the album's cover art as "gorgeous". The album's cover art and booklet were shot at Little Havana in Miami, Florida. Retail chain Target sold a deluxe edition of the album, featuring a remix of "Havana" that included Daddy Yankee. The album was also released in a limited Japanese edition, featuring the aforementioned remix and the song "I Have Questions", released alongside "Crying in the Club" in May. The album's booklet contains several shots similar to the cover, as well as pictures of Cabello recording the album and childhood photos. The album's artwork was shot by Amber Park. It additionally features a message to Cabello's fans, stating "This album saw me enter the room shattered, and nervous, and insecure, and it's seen me come to life, bright-eyed, and ready for anything. So, in other words..... you have my heart in your hands."

== Singles ==
=== "Crying in the Club" ===
Originally, "Crying in the Club" was released as the album's lead single on May 19, 2017. The song reached number 47 on the Billboard Hot 100. The song was accompanied by the promotional single "I Have Questions", released on May 22. The songs were performed together in several promotional appearances.

=== "Havana" ===
"Havana" featuring American rapper Young Thug, was released for radio airplay on September 8, after being released on August 3 alongside the non-album single "OMG"; it was announced on August 30 that it would be serviced as the album's proper lead single after it found early success on streaming platforms, replacing "Crying in the Club". "Havana" has since topped the charts all over the world, reaching number one in Australia, Brazil, Canada, France, Hungary, Ireland, Israel, Mexico, Poland, Scotland, the United Kingdom, and the United States. It also reached the top 10 in a number of countries, including Austria, Belgium, Colombia, Denmark, Germany, Italy, the Netherlands, New Zealand, South Korea, Sweden, and Switzerland. A remix with Daddy Yankee and the original solo version of "Havana" was later released on November 12, 2017, prior to the release of Camila. On September 21, 2018, Cabello released a live version of the song featuring her solo performance. The live version of the song was later nominated for the Grammy Award for Best Pop Solo Performance. The official music video, directed by Dave Meyers, starring Cabello, Noah Centineo, Lele Pons, Marco Delvecchio, Young Thug and LeJuan James, was released on October 24, 2017 and was awarded by MTV Video Music Award for Video of the Year. "Havana" was certified Diamond by the Recording Industry Association of America on October 4, 2021, making Cabello the first Hispanic woman and 2nd Latino woman to achieve this accolade.

=== "Never Be the Same" ===
"Never Be the Same" was announced as the album's second single; it was released for digital download on December 7, 2017, and for radio airplay on January 9, 2018. It entered the top 10 in some countries such as Australia, Ireland and United Kingdom, and peaked at number six on the Billboard Hot 100. The official music video, directed by Grant Singer, was released on March 8, 2018.

=== "Consequences" ===
"Consequences" was announced as the album's third and final single; it impacted contemporary hit radio on October 9, 2018. On the same day, an orchestral version was released digitally, and the song later impacted hot adult contemporary radio on October 22, 2018. A music video directed by Dave Meyers, was released on October 10, 2018, and features an appearance by Dylan Sprouse. In the video, Cabello and Sprouse run around, kiss and make music together. Cabello walks around a park while reminiscing about the couple's relationship. It peaked at number 51 on the US Billboard Hot 100 and number 15 on the US Adult Top 40.

== Promotional single ==
=== "Real Friends" ===
"Real Friends" served as the only official promotional single for the album, being released alongside "Never Be the Same" on December 7, 2017, accompanying the pre-order for the album. An alternative version of the song featuring American musician Swae Lee was released on August 16, 2018.

== Critical reception ==
Professional ratings
Aggregate scores
Source	Rating
AnyDecentMusic?	6.6/10
Metacritic	78/100
Review scores
Source	Rating
AllMusic	4/5 stars
The Daily Telegraph	3/5 stars
Entertainment Weekly	B+
Financial Times	4/5 stars
The Guardian	4/5 stars
The Independent	4/5 stars
NME	4/5 stars
The Observer	3/5 stars
Pitchfork	6.8/10
Rolling Stone	3.5/5 stars

Camila was met with generally positive reviews. At Metacritic, which assigns a normalized rating out of 100, the album received an average score of 78 based on 12 reviews, indicating "generally favorable reviews". Several British publications that reviewed the album a few days before its official release, responded positively to the album as well as Cabello's vocals and songwriting. Kate Solomon from Metro UK perceived the singer's "shaken off the bombastic R&B favored by the 5H crew in favor of a short, sweet album of fairly understated Latin pop and classic pop ballads." The Times' Will Hodgkinson also pointed out that instead of filled with "high-octave pop bangers", the singer has gone the other way, using sparse production techniques to frame songs about love and longing. Nick Levine of the NME deemed the album a "strong and surprisingly confident first impression." For The Guardian's editor Alexis Petridis, Camila is one of those moments where "the committee approach strikes gold: smart enough to avoid smoothing out the quirks and slavishly chasing trends," he also considered it as "a product of the pop factory that doesn't sound run-of-the-mill." Leah Greenblatt from Entertainment Weekly was as positive as Levine and Petridis, giving the album an A she felt it as an "intimate project" where Cabello's voice shines over Latin-influenced songs and powerful ballads. She further commented: "Cabello's voice isn't especially distinctive, but it's instinctually pretty: effortless and warm, with an edge of morning-after rasp."

Patrick Ryan of USA Today complimented the music which the album was built on, labeling it a "vibrant blend of sounds and styles, bolstered by a reliable stable of hit songwriters and producers." Although he also felt that Cabello's over-reliance on AutoTune is "unnecessary" given the strength of her TV and acoustic performances. Sam Lansky of Time magazine stated Cabello proves she has the "chops to stand alone in the spotlight." As did Lansky, Newsday writer Glenn Gamboa believed that with Camila, she proves that she is a forced to be "reckoned with and ready to be one of 2018's breakout stars." Rob Sheffield of Rolling Stone and Matt Collar from AllMusic gave Camila three and a half stars out of a possible five. Sheffield and Collar expressed a similar sentiment: Camila is a personal statement, a "produced set of romantic pop, punctuated by several rhythmically infectious Latin-influenced tracks informed by her Cuban-Mexican heritage."

Mike Nied from Idolator found the album an "authentic and cohesive work", and acclaimed the singer's performance for "blending her distinctive brand of folksy pop with a Latin flair" and "delivering an impressive body of work." Similar to other critics, Taylor Weatherby of Billboard noted its "radio-friendly" tracks, but also highlighted the most personal songs, saying "something that should certainly be recognized is Cabello's relentless vulnerability as she sings about the woes of both romantic and friendly relationships." Concluding his review, he opined: "As a girl who got her start as one of five, Cabello has vocally, lyrically and impressively established that she was always meant to be simply Camila." In his article for the website Stereogum, Chris DeVille was positive, noting the tracks range from the most "Latin-tinged club tracks" like "Havana" and "She Loves Control" to "wistful" piano ballads like "Consequences" and "Something's Gotta Give". In a mixed review for The Observer, Kitty Empire noted the album's "processed sound" "achieves cohesion, despite the many production hands on deck." She further added, "the raunchy come-hithers you assume have been dropped in late in the day can be as boring and samey as piano ballads. But here, Cabello acquitted herself well as an R&B vixen." Neil McCormick of The Daily Telegraph commented, "a few songs convey a charming honesty and vulnerability, perhaps a relic of the album's original themes." However, he argued, "there remains a gulf between the craft of commercial pop and the artistry of confessional songwriting, and there is not much doubt about which has been prioritized on Camila."

=== Accolades ===
==== Year-end lists ====
Year-end lists
Publication	Accolade	Rank	Ref.
Billboard	The 50 Best Albums of 2018	8	
City Pages	Every No. 1 album from 2018, ranked	3	
Entertainment Weekly	The 20 Best Albums of 2018	10	
PopCrush	The 20 Best Albums of 2018	—N/a	
Refinery29	The 10 Best Albums of 2018	10	
Rolling Stone	The 50 Best Albums of 2018	3	
Rolling Stone	The 20 Best Pop Albums of 2018	1	
The Independent	The 40 Best Albums of 2018	25	
Time	The 10 Best Albums of 2018	10	
Uproxx	The 50 Best Albums of 2018	20	

==== Awards and nominations ====
Awards
Year	Organization	Award	Result	Ref.
2018	LOS40 Music Awards (Spain)	International Album of the Year	Nominated	
2018	People's Choice Awards (US)	Album of 2018	Nominated	
2019	Grammy Awards (US)	Best Pop Vocal Album	Nominated	
2019	Juno Awards (Canada)	International Album of the Year	Nominated	

== Commercial performance ==
=== United States ===
In the United States, Camila debuted at number one on the US Billboard 200 earning 119,000 album-equivalent units, with 65,000 coming from pure album sales. Cabello became the youngest artist to top the chart with a debut set since Shawn Mendes's 2015 debut Handwritten. She was the first female artist to debut with a full-length album in three years since Meghan Trainor's Title and the first female artist to have her debut album debut at the top of the Billboard 200 since Ariana Grande's debut album Yours Truly in 2013. Cabello also joined a list of female artists who have achieved a number-one solo album after reaching the chart with groups, alongside Gwen Stefani (No Doubt), Beyoncé and LeToya (Destiny's Child), Lauryn Hill (Fugees), Patti LaBelle (Labelle), Stevie Nicks (Fleetwood Mac), Diana Ross (The Supremes) and Janis Joplin (Big Brother and the Holding Company). Cabello topped the Billboard 200, Hot 100 (with "Havana"), and the Artist 100 charts in the same week, being the first female artist to do so since Adele in 2015 and the first overall since Kendrick Lamar in May 2017. She also was the third female artist to have her first single and her first album at the top of both charts, the first being Britney Spears in 1999 with her single "...Baby One More Time" and her debut album of the same name and Beyoncé in 2003 with her single "Crazy In Love" and her debut album "Dangerously In Love". In its second week, Camila dropped from 1 to 4 with 43,000 units sold; and in the third week, to number 7 with 37,000 units.

=== Worldwide ===
Camila debuted at number 2 on the UK Albums Chart, behind The Greatest Showman soundtrack with first week sales of 21,561 units. Cabello previously reached the number 6 position with her former girl group Fifth Harmony. In its second week the album fell to number 6 in the UK.

Worldwide, Camila reached number 1 in eight countries including Canada, Mexico, Spain and the United States, it also hit the top ten in eighteen countries, including the UK, Australia, New Zealand and Ireland. It has been certified Platinum in 9 countries, including Mexico, and the United States. It has been certified 2× Platinum in Canada 2× Platinum in Norway and Diamond in Brazil.

== Tour ==
Never Be the Same Tour
- World tour by Camila Cabello
- Location: Asia; Europe; North America; South America
- Associated album: Camila
- Start date: April 9, 2018
- End date: March 5, 2019
- Legs: 7
- No. of shows: 40
- Attendance: 24,287 (5 shows)
- Box office: $1,276,679 (5 shows)

Camila Cabello concert chronology
- Never Be the Same Tour (2018–19); Yours, C Tour (2025)

On February 14, 2018, Cabello announced the Never Be the Same Tour, her first as a solo artist, through her Instagram account. Within a day after the general sale started, every date had sold out. The tour began on April 9, 2018, in Vancouver, Canada at the Orpheum Theatre and continued until March 5, 2019, in Houston, Texas. Cabello also performed songs from the album as the opening act on Taylor Swift's Reputation Stadium Tour. A portion of the singer's proceeds from sales of VIP packages were donated to the Children's Health Fund.

== Track listing ==
Standard edition
No.	Title	Writer(s)	Producer(s)	Length
1.	"Never Be the Same"	Camila Cabello; Adam Feeney; Leo Rami Dawod; Jacob Ludwig Olofsson; Noonie Bao; Sasha Yatchenko	Frank Dukes; Jarami^{[a]}	3:46
2.	"All These Years"	Cabello; Feeney; Kaan Gunesberk; Jeff Gitelman; Mustafa Ahmed	Dukes; Louis Bell^{[b]}	2:44
3.	"She Loves Control"	Cabello; Skrillex; Feeney; Bell; Ilsey Juber; Ahmed	Skrillex; Dukes^{[a]}; Bell^{[b]}	2:57
4.	"Havana" (featuring Young Thug)	Cabello; Jeffery Williams; Feeney; Brittany Hazzard; Ali Tamposi; Brian Lee; Andrew Watt; Pharrell Williams; Bell; Gunesberk	Dukes; Matt Beckley^{[b]}	3:37
5.	"Inside Out"	Cabello; Hazzard; Feeney; Tyler Williams; Gunesberk	Dukes; T-Minus; Bell^{[b]}	3:02
6.	"Consequences"	Cabello; Amy Wadge; Nicolle Galyon; Emily Weisband	Bart Schoudel^{[b]}	2:58
7.	"Real Friends"	Cabello; Feeney; William Walsh; Bell; Lee	Dukes; Bell^{[b]}	3:34
8.	"Something's Gotta Give"	Cabello; Alex Schwartz; Joe Khajadourian; Sarah Hudson; James Abrahart; Jesse Saint John	The Futuristics; Dukes^{[a]}; Beckley^{[b]}	3:56
9.	"In the Dark"	Cabello; Feeney; Te Whiti Warbrick; Simon Wilcox; Madison Love; Abrahart	Dukes; SickDrumz^{[a]}; Kuk Harrell^{[b]}	3:39
10.	"Into It"	Cabello; Feeney; Bell; Gunesberk; Ryan Tedder; Justin Tranter	Dukes	2:55
11.	"Never Be the Same" (Radio edit)	Cabello; Feeney; Dawod; Olofsson; Bao; Yatchenko	Dukes; Jarami^{[a]}	3:47
Total length:				36:55

US Target edition bonus track
No.	Title	Writer(s)	Producer(s)	Length
12.	"Havana" (Remix) (with Daddy Yankee)	Cabello; Ramón Luis Ayala Rodríguez; Feeney; Hazzard; Tamposi; Lee; Watt; P. Williams; Bell; Gunesberk	Dukes; Beckley^{[b]}	3:19
Total length:				40:14

Japanese edition bonus track
No.	Title	Writer(s)	Producer(s)	Length
13.	"I Have Questions"	Cabello; Jesse Shatkin; Bibi Bourelly	Shatkin; Dukes^{[c]}	3:42
Total length:				43:56

Notes

- ^{^[a]} signifies a co-producer.
- ^{^[b]} signifies a vocal producer.
- ^{^[c]} signifies an additional producer.
- "Havana" features background vocals by Pharrell Williams and Starrah.
- The album liner notes for "Consequences" only credit the track's vocal producer Bart Schoudel.
- "I Have Questions" features background vocals by Bibi Bourelly.

== Personnel ==
Credits adapted from Jaxsta and the liner notes of standard edition of Camila.

=== Performers and musicians ===
- Camila Cabello – lead vocals, songwriting
- Young Thug – featured artist (4)
- Serafin Aguilar – trumpet (4)
- Rami Dawod – (1, 11)
- Frank Dukes – synth (1, 9–11), percussion (1, 10–11), guitar (2–3, 8), keyboards (3), bass, piano (4, 9)
- Ben Foran – guitar (7)
- The Futuristics – bass, guitar, programming (8)
- Kaan Güneşberk – guitar (2), keyboards (2, 4), piano, vibraphone (5), synth (10)
- Loshendrix – guitar (3)
- Josh Kerr – piano (6)
- Brian Lee – guitar (7)
- Tom Moffett – trumpet (4)
- Starrah – background vocals (4)
- Leland Whitty – saxophone (4)
- Pharrell Williams – background vocals (4)

=== Production ===
- Matt Beckley – vocal production (4, 8), engineering (8)
- Louis Bell – vocal production (2–3, 5, 7), recording (2–3, 5, 7, 10)
- Scott Desmarais – mixing assistant (3, 5, 8–9)
- Morning Estrada – recording (7)
- Marco Falcone – recording assistant (4)
- Robin Florent – mixing assistant (3, 5, 8–9)
- Frank Dukes – executive production, production (1–2, 4–5, 7, 9–10), co-production (3, 8)
- The Futuristics – production (8)
- Chris Galland – mix engineering (3, 5, 8–9)
- Mike Gaydusek – recording (4)
- Şerban Ghenea – mixing (1–2, 6–7, 10)
- Henry Guevara – recording assistant (4)
- John Hanes – engineered for mix (1–2, 6–7, 10)
- Kuk Harrell – vocal production (9), engineering (9)
- Jarami – co-production (1)
- Ivan Jimenez – mixing assistant (4)
- Jaycen Joshua – mixing (4)
- Dave Kutch – mastering
- Sean Madden – recording assistant (4)
- Kyle Mann – recording (4)
- Manny Marroquin – mixing (3, 5, 8–9)
- David Nakaji – mixing assistant (4)
- Bart Schoudel – vocal production (6), recording (1, 6)
- SickDrumz – co-production (9)
- Robbie Soukiasyan – recording (4)
- Skrillex – production (3)
- T-Minus – production (5)
- Simone Torres – engineering (9)

=== Design ===
- Anita Marisa Boriboon – creative direction
- Dennis Leupold – photography
- Maria Paula Marulanda – photoshoot art direction
- Amber Park – album package, art direction, design
- Danny Santiago – styling

== Charts ==
=== Weekly charts ===
Chart (2018)	Peak position
Argentine Albums (CAPIF)	2
Australian Albums (ARIA)	3
Austrian Albums (Ö3 Austria)	6
Belgian Albums (Ultratop Flanders)	3
Belgian Albums (Ultratop Wallonia)	8
Canadian Albums (Billboard)	1
Czech Albums (ČNS IFPI)	2
Danish Albums (Hitlisten)	4
Dutch Albums (Album Top 100)	1
Finnish Albums (Suomen virallinen lista)	2
French Albums (SNEP)	7
German Albums (Offizielle Top 100)	8
Hungarian Albums (MAHASZ)	15
Greece Albums (IFPI Greece)	18
Irish Albums (IRMA)	3
Italian Albums (FIMI)	8
Japan Hot Albums (Billboard Japan)	11
Japanese Albums (Oricon)	15
Japanese International Albums (Oricon)	2
Mexican Albums (AMPROFON)	1
New Zealand Albums (RMNZ)	3
Norwegian Albums (VG-lista)	1
Polish Albums (ZPAV)	4
Portuguese Albums (AFP)	1
Scottish Albums (Official Charts)	2
South Korean International Albums (Circle)	5
Spanish Albums (Promusicae)	1
Swedish Albums (Sverigetopplistan)	1
Swiss Albums (Schweizer Hitparade)	3
UK Albums (Official Charts)	2
US Billboard 200	1

=== Year-end charts ===
Chart (2018)	Position
Australian Albums (ARIA)	48
Belgian Albums (Ultratop Flanders)	54
Belgian Albums (Ultratop Wallonia)	159
Canadian Albums (Billboard)	16
Czech Albums (ČNS IFPI)	9
Danish Albums (Hitlisten)	32
Dutch Albums (MegaCharts)	34
French Albums (SNEP)	84
Icelandic Albums (Plötutíóindi)	32
Irish Albums (IRMA)	24
Japanese Albums (Billboard Japan)	93
Mexican Albums (AMPROFON)	17
New Zealand Albums (RMNZ)	28
South Korean International Albums (Gaon)	18
Spain (PROMUSICAE)	38
Spain Top 100 Streaming Albums (PROMUSICAE)	31
Swedish Albums (Sverigetopplistan)	15
UK Albums (OCC)	43
US Billboard 200	25

Chart (2019)	Position
US Billboard 200	94

=== Decade-end charts ===
Chart (2010–2019)	Position
US Billboard 200	142

== Certifications ==
Region	Certification	Certified units/sales
Australia (ARIA)	Gold	35,000^{‡}
Brazil (Pro-Música Brasil)	Diamond	160,000^{‡}
Canada (Music Canada)	2× Platinum	160,000^{‡}
Denmark (IFPI Danmark)	Platinum	20,000^{‡}
France (SNEP)	Platinum	100,000^{‡}
Italy (FIMI)	Gold	25,000^{‡}
Mexico (AMPROFON)	Platinum+Gold	90,000^{‡}
Netherlands (NVPI)	Platinum	40,000^{‡}
New Zealand (RMNZ)	3× Platinum	45,000^{‡}
Norway (IFPI Norway)	2× Platinum	40,000^{‡}
Poland (ZPAV)	2× Platinum	40,000^{‡}
Sweden (GLF)	Gold	15,000^{‡}
Switzerland (IFPI Switzerland)	Platinum	20,000^{‡}
United Kingdom (BPI)	Gold	100,000^{‡}
United States (RIAA)	Platinum	1,000,000^{‡}
^{‡} Sales+streaming figures based on certification alone.

== See also ==
- List of number-one albums in Norway
- List of number-one albums in Sweden
- List of number-one albums of 2018 (Spain)
- List of number-one albums of 2018 (Portugal)
- List of number-one albums of 2018 (Mexico)
- List of number-one albums of 2018 (Canada)
- List of Billboard 200 number-one albums of 2018
