= Jarami =

Swedish musical artist and production duo

- Origin: Stockholm, Sweden
- Genres: Electronic; pop
- Years active: 2015–present
- Labels: RCA
- Members: Rami Dawod; Jacob Olofsson
- Website: jaramimusic.com

Jarami is a Swedish artist and Grammy Award-winning, multi-platinum selling production duo, consisting of Rami Dawod and Jacob Olofsson. Based in Stockholm, they achieved prominence initially as remixers, then for producing Frank Ocean's singles "Lens," "Biking," and "Chanel"; co-producing Camila Cabello's number one pop radio hit "Never Be the Same"; and producing Silk City and Dua Lipa's "Electricity."

Their music blends electronic elements and live instrumentation, with influences from classic soul, house, and psychedelic rock.

== Musical career ==
Dawod and Olofsson first met in 2010, bonding over a mutual love of R&B and started working together as Jarami in 2015. As they worked on a variety of remixes, their efforts began to attract notice. Their remix of Rihanna's "Bitch Better Have My Money" helped launch their career, and their remix of Aaliyah "Rock the Boat" notched over a million plays on SoundCloud. Their early successes also include a remix of Wafia's "Heartburn," which since its release in May 2016 has received over 9 million streams on Spotify.

2017 was a breakout year for Jarami, this time as major producers. Their collaborations with Frank Ocean on the three singles "Lens," "Biking," and "Chanel" and with Camila Cabello on the Billboard #1 hit "Never Be The Same" helped cement their reputation as A-list producers. Barack Obama named "Chanel" one of his favorite tracks of 2017.

In May 2017 they released their debut EP, Sketches, a four-song instrumental collection, on Stick Figure Records, emerging further into the spotlight as artists on their own. The first single, "Aurora," premiered on The Fader on 4 May 2017, followed by second single "Pretty Big House" on 15 May.

During the summer of 2017 they brought their live show to major festivals and venues including Way Out West in their native Sweden and DC10 in Ibiza, where they shared a bill with Disclosure.

They released their follow-up EP, Sketches II, in October 2017. It included the single "Hear This," which, had the unusual feature of children's vocals and was featured on Apple Music's Beats 1 list for three weeks in the BREAKING: New Discoveries section. "Hear This" was also one of Australian national radio station Triple J most played songs of 2018.

At the start of 2018 they were #1 on NME's list of "Essential new music for 2018." At the same time they remained in high demand as producers. In 2018 they were tapped to collaborate with artists Dua Lipa, Mark Ronson, and Diplo eventually creating the song "Electricity" which they won Best Dance Recording at the 2019 Grammy Awards for.

Jarami's 2018 concert schedule included Corona Capital in Guadalajara, Mexico , Sónar in Barcelona, Spain, and the Corona Sunsets Festival in Okinawa, Japan.

== Discography ==
=== EPs ===
- Sketches (June 2017)
- Sketches II (December 2018)

=== Singles ===
- "No Chance" (2018)

==== As producer ====
- Marc E. Bassy – "You & Me" ft. G-Eazy (2016) – RIAA Platinum
- Frank Ocean – "Lens" (2017)
- Frank Ocean – "Biking" (2017)
- Frank Ocean – "Chanel" (2017) - RIAA Platinum”
- Camila Cabello – "Never Be the Same" (2017) – Billboard No. 1 RIAA Multi Platinum
- Silk City and Dua Lipa – "Electricity" (2018) RIAA Platinum

=== Remixes ===
- Rihanna – "Bitch Better Have My Money" (2015)
- Aaliyah – "Rock The Boat" ft. Marc E. Bassy (2015)
- HONNE – "Good Together" (2016)
- Wafia – "Heartburn" (2016)
- CHINAH – "We Go Back" ft. Skizzy Mars (2016)
- KILL J – "You're Good But I'm Better" ft. Marc E. Bassy (2016)
