= Sangria: A Recipe for Love =

Sangria: A Recipe for Love is a 2009 novel written by Manuela Requena (ISBN 978-0979811678). It has been described as "the first ever book about cookery in Fiction form" and includes 25 recipes. The book won the Best Food Literature Book award for 2009 at the Gourmand World Cookbook Awards in Paris, February 2010.
