= She Loves Control =

2018 song by Camila Cabello

Song by Camila Cabello

from the album Camila
- Released: January 12, 2018
- Recorded: 2017
- Studio: Electric Feel Recording (West Hollywood, California)
- Genre: EDM; reggaeton
- Length: 2:57
- Label: Epic; Syco
- Songwriters: Camila Cabello; Sonny John Moore; Adam Feeney; Louis Bell; Ilsey Juber; Mustafa Ahmed
- Producers: Skrillex; Frank Dukes (co.); Bell (voc.)

"She Loves Control" is a song by American singer Camila Cabello, included on her debut studio album Camila (2018). It was written by Cabello, Ilsey Juber and Mustafa Ahmed and producers Skrillex, Frank Dukes and Louis Bell. Musically, "She Loves Control" is an EDM and reggaeton track that uses elements of moombahton. The song received generally positive reviews from music critics, who commended its production. Commercially, it debuted in Norway and the United Kingdom, peaking at 36 and 40, respectively. Moreover, it charted in Switzerland, Spain, Canada, Sweden and the Netherlands, peaking at 59, 69, 77, 77 and 81, respectively. In the United Kingdom, "She Loves Control" received a silver certification for 200,000 copies sold in the country.

== Composition ==
"She Loves Control" is an "electronica-tinged, dancehall-ready" track including a Spanish guitar and a thumping bassline. In an interview backstage at KDWB Jingle Ball 2017, a fan asked Cabello what her favorite song to perform was; she responded saying "I'm excited to perform this one song, it's called 'She Loves Control' and I'm excited to perform it just because it's very fun. I wouldn't say it's my favorite one on the album because they're all my favorites for different reasons, just excited to perform that one because I feel like it's gonna have - cool - like dance stuff".

== Critical reception ==
Jamieson Cox of Pitchfork penned, "'She Loves Control' is an apt mission statement for a star who soured on girl group life because she couldn't explore [her] individuality, and it shows Cabello can navigate a moombahton rhythm with the same ease that characterized 'Havana.'"

== Credits and personnel ==
Credits adapted from the liner notes of Camila.

Publishing

- Published by Sony/ATV Songs LLC (BMI) O/b/O Sony ATV Music Publishing (UK) Ltd./Maidmetal Limited (PRS)/Milamoon Songs (BMI) // Copaface (ASCAP) All rights admin. by Kobalt Songs Music Publishing // EMI April Music, Inc. (ASCAP) O/b/O EMI Music Publishing Ltd. (PRS)/Nyankingmusic (ASCAP) // EMI April Music, Inc. (ASCAP) // Sony/ATV Songs LLC/Sparko Phone Music (BMI) // Mustafaahmed Publishing Designee

Recording

- Recorded at Electric Feel Recording Studio, West Hollywood, California
- Mixed at Larrabee Studio, West Hollywood, California
- Mastered at Sterling Sound, New York City, New York

Personnel

- Camila Cabello – vocals, songwriting
- Skrillex – production, songwriting
- Frank Dukes – co-production, songwriting
- Louis Bell – vocal production, recording, songwriting
- Ilsey Juber – songwriting
- Mustafa Ahmed – songwriting
- Los Hendrix – guitar
- Manny Marroquin – mixing
- Chris Galland – mix engineering
- Robin Florent – mixing assistant
- Scott Desmarais – mixing assistant
- Kevin Peterson – mastering

== Charts ==
Chart performance for "She Loves Control"
Chart (2018)	Peak position
Canada Hot 100 (Billboard)	77
Ecuador (National-Report)	47
Netherlands (Single Top 100)	81
New Zealand Heatseekers (RMNZ)	1
Norway (VG-lista)	36
Portugal (AFP)	52
Spain (Promusicae)	69
Sweden (Sverigetopplistan)	77
Switzerland (Schweizer Hitparade)	59
UK Singles (Official Charts)	40
Venezuela (National-Report)	49

== Certifications ==
Region	Certification	Certified units/sales
Brazil (Pro-Música Brasil)	2× Platinum	80,000^{‡}
Canada (Music Canada)	Platinum	80,000^{‡}
New Zealand (RMNZ)	Gold	15,000^{‡}
Norway (IFPI Norway)	Platinum	60,000^{‡}
United Kingdom (BPI)	Silver	200,000^{‡}
United States (RIAA)	Gold	500,000^{‡}
^{‡} Sales+streaming figures based on certification alone.
