= Consequences (song) =

2018 single by Camila Cabello

- Orchestral version artwork

Single by Camila Cabello

from the album Camila
- Released: October 9, 2018
- Studio: Windmark (Santa Monica, California)
- Genre: Pop; orchestral pop
- Length: 2:58 (original version); 3:01 (orchestral version)
- Label: Epic; Syco
- Songwriters: Camila Cabello; Amy Wadge; Nicolle Galyon; Emily Weisband
- Producer: Emile Haynie

Camila Cabello singles chronology
"Real Friends" (2018)	"Consequences" (2018)	"Mi Persona Favorita" (2019)

Music video
- "Consequences" on YouTube

"Consequences" is a song by American singer and songwriter Camila Cabello from her debut studio album Camila (2018). Two different versions of the song were released as the album's third and final single on October 9, 2018, by Epic Records and Syco. It was written by Cabello, Amy Wadge, Nicolle Galyon and Emily Weisband, and produced by Emile Haynie and Bart Schoudel. "Consequences" is a piano-led ballad. Lyrically, it is about the impact of a partner that was in Cabello's life. The singer teased its single release by sending packages to fans on October 3, 2018.

A music video for the orchestral version, directed by Dave Meyers, was released on October 10, 2018. A vertical video was also released, showing the singer singing in front of an orchestra. The song was performed on Le Rico Show sur NRJ, Good Morning America and the American Music Awards of 2018. It won the Best Lyrics award at the 2019 iHeartRadio Music Awards.

== Composition ==
Ed Sheeran sent the song to Camila by e-mail after listening in a session with Amy Wadge.

"Consequences" is a piano-led ballad. Lyrically, it is about the impact of a partner that was in her life. Sam Lansky of Time cited the song as a "heartfelt" track both lyrically and musically while applauding its "pretty-ballad" songwriting for showcasing Cabello's voice.

The song is performed in the key of C major in 3/4 time with a tempo of 105 beats per minute. Cabello's vocals span from G_{3} to A_{5}.

In March 2022, the original demo version was posted online.

== Critical reception ==
Alexis Petridis of The Guardian portrayed, "The piano ballad Consequences is an unexpected triumph: eschewing the usual melodramatics, Cabello’s vocal is controlled, delicate and affecting, while the accompaniment vaguely recalls – of all things – Asleep by the Smiths." Writing for The Observer, Kitty Empire opined the track, "Consequences exhibits greater-than-average originality. 'Lost a little weight because I wasn't eating,' croons Cabello; 'loving you had consequences'." Dennis Leupold of Rolling Stone expressed, "this girl definitely puts more of her heart into the emo. Cabello has a real flair for melancholy piano break-up ballads, as in 'Consequences,' where she ponders the high price of love: 'Dirty tissues, trust issues.'" Jamieson Cox of Pitchfork stated that "The overwrought one-two punch of 'Consequences'—which sounds a little like her attempt at something like Rihanna's 'Stay'" Sam Lansky of Time applauded its "pretty-ballad" songwriting for showcasing Cabello's voice while citing the song as a "heartfelt" track both lyrically and musically. Nick Levine of NME penned, "Stripped-down piano ballad ‘Consequences’ feels even more candid: she tells a former partner that 'loving you was dumb and dark and cheap,' and says she 'lost a little weight because I wasn't eating.'"

== Music videos ==
A music video for the orchestral version, directed by Dave Meyers, was released on October 10, 2018. It featured an appearance by Dylan Sprouse. In the video, Cabello and Sprouse run around, kiss and make music together. Cabello walks around a park while reminiscing about the couple's relationship. As of June 2019, the music video for orchestra version has over 42 million views on YouTube and 80 million streams on Spotify.

A vertical video was released on November 13, 2018, on her official Vevo account. The video was previously a Spotify exclusive, released on October 30. The black-and-white video features Cabello singing in front of an orchestra in a studio, and as she writes and records the tune in the studio.

== Accolades ==
Year	Organization	Award	Result	Ref.
2019	iHeartRadio Music Awards	Best Lyrics	Won	

== Live performances ==
The song was performed at Le Rico Show sur NRJ, Good Morning America and the American Music Awards of 2018. It also appeared on the setlist for Cabello's Never Be the Same Tour and when she opened for Taylor Swift's Reputation Stadium Tour.

== Cover versions ==
Lynnea Moorer performed the song on the fifteenth season of The Voice (U.S.), where she was a contestant during the third week. Cabello praised Moorer's "powerful" cover, which was accompanied by a piano, cello and violin. Writing for Billboard, Emina Lukarcanin described the performance as "enchanting", stating that her "voice gracefully reached both high and low notes as she dazzled in a green off-shoulder top and matching glittery eyeshadow".

== Track listings ==
Digital download
No.	Title	Length
1.	"Consequences"	2:58

Digital download – orchestral version
No.	Title	Length
1.	"Consequences" (Orchestra)	3:01

== Credits and personnel ==
Credits adapted from the liner notes of Camila.

Recording

- Recorded at Windmark Recording, Santa Monica, California
- Mixed at MixStar Studios, Virginia Beach, Virginia
- Mastered at the Mastering Palace, New York City, New York

Personnel

- Camila Cabello – vocals, songwriting
- Amy Wadge – songwriting
- Nicolle Galyon – songwriting
- Emily Weisband – songwriting
- Emile Haynie – production
- Bart Schoudel – vocal production, recording
- Josh Kerr – piano
- Serban Ghenea – mixing
- John Hanes – engineering
- Dave Kutch – mastering

== Charts ==
Chart (2018–2019)	Peak position
Belgium (Ultratip Bubbling Under Flanders)	21
Belgium (Ultratip Bubbling Under Wallonia)	1
Canada Hot 100 (Billboard)	75
Canada AC (Billboard)	31
Canada CHR/Top 40 (Billboard)	29
Canada Hot AC (Billboard)	35
Greece (IFPI)	85
Ireland (IRMA)	52
Lebanon (OLT20)	15
Lithuania (AGATA)	54
New Zealand Hot Singles (Recorded Music NZ)	16
Portugal (AFP)	60
US Billboard Hot 100	51
US Adult Pop Airplay (Billboard)	15
US Pop Airplay (Billboard)	14

== Certifications ==
Region	Certification	Certified units/sales
Brazil (Pro-Música Brasil)	2× Platinum	80,000^{‡}
Canada (Music Canada)	Platinum	80,000^{‡}
Mexico (AMPROFON)	Gold	30,000^{‡}
New Zealand (RMNZ)	Gold	15,000^{‡}
Poland (ZPAV)	Gold	10,000^{‡}
Portugal (AFP)	Gold	5,000^{‡}
United Kingdom (BPI)	Silver	200,000^{‡}
United States (RIAA)	Platinum	1,000,000^{‡}
^{‡} Sales+streaming figures based on certification alone.

== Release history ==
List of release dates, showing region, format(s), version(s), label(s) and reference(s)
Region	Date	Format(s)	Version(s)	Label(s)	Ref.
United States	October 9, 2018	Contemporary hit radio	Original	Epic	
Various	October 9, 2018	Digital download; streaming	Orchestra	Epic; Syco	
United States	October 16, 2018	Contemporary hit radio	Orchestra	Epic	
United States	October 22, 2018	Hot adult contemporary	Orchestra	Epic	
