= I Have Questions =

Promotional single by Camila Cabello
- A-side: "Crying in the Club"
- Released: May 22, 2017
- Recorded: January 2017
- Studio: The Big Cage (Los Angeles)
- Length: 3:42
- Label: Epic; Syco
- Songwriters: Camila Cabello; Jesse Shatkin; Bibi Bourelly
- Producer: Jesse Shatkin

Camila Cabello promotional singles chronology
"I Have Questions" (2017)	"OMG" (2017)

Lyric video
- "I Have Questions" on YouTube

"I Have Questions" is a song by American singer and songwriter Camila Cabello. It was released on May 22, 2017, by Epic Records and Syco Music. It was first featured as an intro on the music video for her debut single "Crying in the Club". It was written by Cabello with Bibi Bourelly and Jesse Shatkin, who also produced, recorded and programmed the track.

Cabello wrote the song while she was still touring with her then-group Fifth Harmony. It was the first song she wrote for her debut album, inspiring the direction of the project that was then called The Hurting. The Healing. The Loving. According to her, this was "The Hurting" part of the album. The song, however, was not included in the final standard track listing after the album's re-imagination. It is included in the Japan limited pressing of Cabello's debut studio album Camila (2018) as a bonus track, and is the B-side of the 7-inch single of her solo debut "Crying in the Club".

"I Have Questions" is built around melancholic lyrics. The singer does not understand why her friend has betrayed her and has questions for them. Its dark production features a prominent cello line and drum machine beats that begin after the second chorus. On its release, the song charted in Spain, Portugal and France. Cabello performed the song at the 2017 Billboard Music Awards, the 2017 iHeartRadio Much Music Video Awards and Britain's Got Talent.

== Background and release ==
In 2012, Cabello auditioned as a solo contestant on the American version of The X Factor. After failing as a soloist, she was selected to compete on the show in a group with four other contestants. Together, they formed Fifth Harmony, finished third in the competition, and then signed a joint record deal with Simon Cowell's label Syco Records and L.A. Reid's label Epic Records. Cabello collaborated as a member of the group for three years, releasing two studio albums, an extended play and eight singles. According to Nielsen Soundscan, the group had sold more than seven million digital downloads in the United States before her departure in December 2016. While touring to promote their second album 7/27 (2016), Cabello felt lonely and sad and wrote songs to express her feelings and to help her to get negative things "off her chest". She wrote "I Have Questions" in a hotel bathroom during a very low moment of her life. She explained in May 2017:

"I started writing (it) in a hotel bathroom on tour a little over a year ago. I was completely broken during that time, I was in the kind of pain that's uncomfortable to talk about, and it was the kind of chapter you never want to read out loud."

— Camila Cabello on "I Have Questions" writing.

In an interview with Latina magazine, she commented on her decision to leave Fifth Harmony and her future plans saying: "I needed to follow my heart and my artistic vision. I'm grateful for everything we had in Fifth Harmony and for [this new] opportunity. I am less focused on success and more on doing my best and pursuing my artistic vision to the fullest, wherever that takes me." In early 2017, she started recording her solo debut album which she titled The Hurting. The Healing. The Loving. During recording sessions, Cabello returned to writing "I Have Questions", forcing herself to confront her feelings. The results inspired Cabello to keep writing songs where she could express her feelings, making music that was helping her to "heal". As she explained in a message posted on social media: "I realized I wasn't making music just to make an album anymore, I was making this music to heal, it wasn't until I had made enough songs to listen back to and realized I could hear myself coming back through these songs. I didn't write it with the intention of delivering a message, but I realized the message was in the hurting, the healing, and the loving."

In May 2017, she finally teased her first solo material revealing the title of the album, and a release date for her first solo single, "Crying in the Club". It was released on May 19, 2017, along with its music video, which features an intro that incorporates the lines from the first verse of "I Have Questions". On May 22, she published the lyric video for the song. It was later released to music stores and streaming services. However, later in the year, Cabello announced that the album's title would be changed and all the previously released material, including "I Have Questions", would not be included on the final cut. The album's new title was Camila. In interview with Zane Lowe for Beats 1, Cabello explained that she no longer felt those songs represented the artist she had become. She confirmed that the only previously released track appearing on the album would be "Havana." The song is featured as the thirteenth track on the Japanese limited edition CD.

== Composition ==
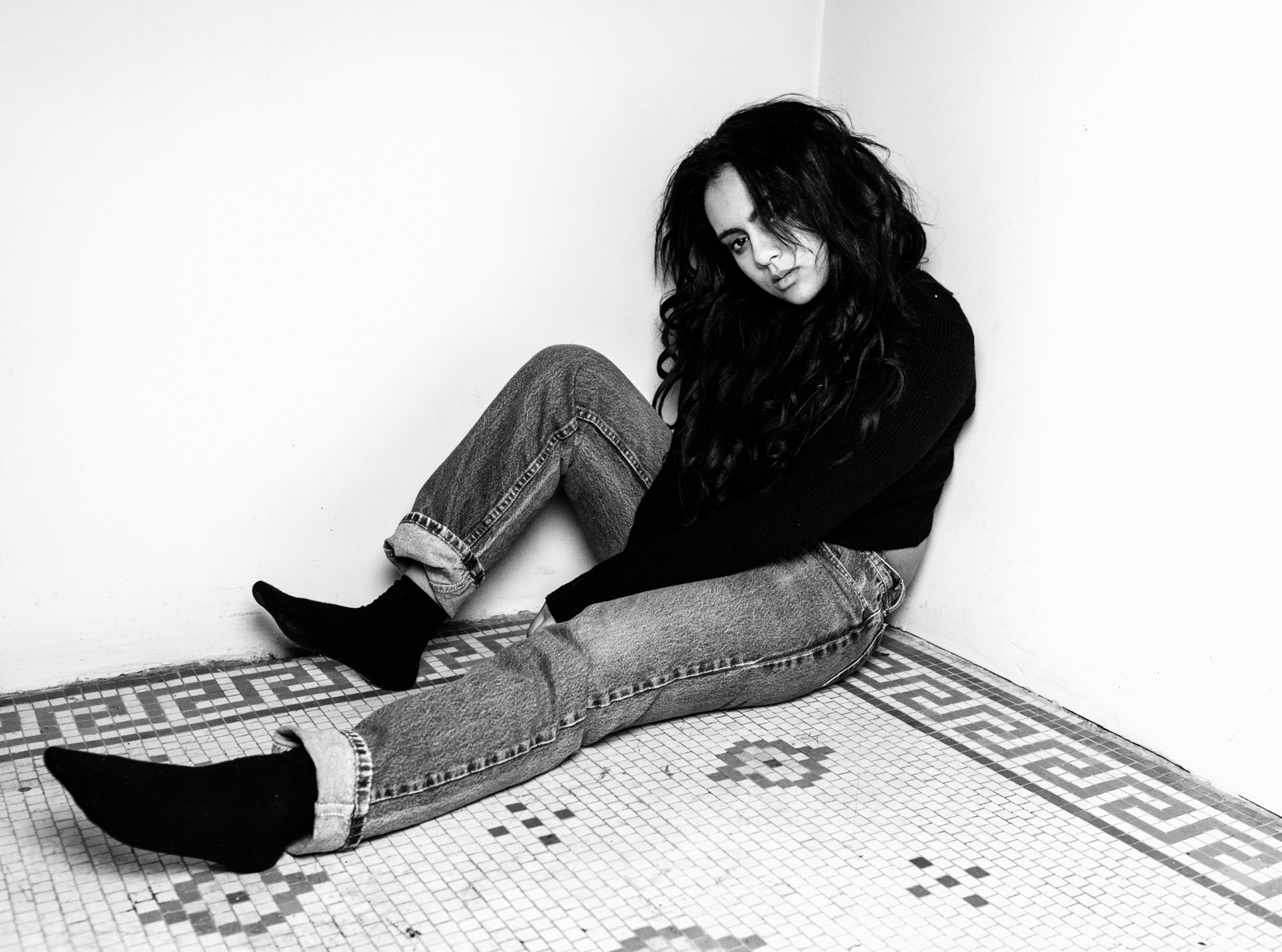
Songwriter Bibi Bourelly, best known for co-writing songs for Rihanna's Anti album (2016), co-wrote the song with Cabello and its producer Jesse Shatkin.

"I Have Questions" has a dark, melancholic sound with themes of abandonment and the acknowledgement that a former companion was not who they appeared to be. Cabello has explained that the song is about a friendship that went awry, adding that she wrote it with one person in mind, but there are others to whom the song is directed. As the song title implies, the singer has many questions for the song's subject. Throughout the song, she expresses her confusion, looking for answers and explanations. As the song opens, she airs out her feelings in the first verse, over a soft cello line, "Why did you leave me here to burn? / I'm way too young to be this hurt / I feel doomed in hotel rooms / Staring straight up at the wall / Counting wounds and I am trying to numb them all / Do you care? / Why don't you care?" Singing the second verse, Cabello wonders how someone could cut her so deeply: "Number one, tell me who you think you are / You got some nerve trying to tear my faith apart / Number two, why would you try and play me for a fool? / I should have never ever ever trusted you."

The song continues with drum machine beats and hi-hat reminiscent of trap music. Lucas Villa from AXS noted that instead of "staying a victim", Cabello expresses herself as a "survivor on this haunting and honest interrogation session". Mike Pell of MTV News felt that the song's production recalls Britney Spears' "Everytime" (2004). Rolling Stone's Althea Legaspi wrote that Cabello sings with "raw emotion".

== Reception ==
Reviewing Camila, Kitty Empire of The Guardian commented on the change of the material for the album. She felt the exclusion of "I Have Questions" was "unexpected" as she views the song as "excellent". Rob Sheffield of Rolling Stone magazine, described it as "brooding" and praised its stripped-down production, while Taylor Weatherby of Billboard characterized it as "poignant".

On its release, "I Have Questions" had minimal commercial success. It debuted at number 94 in France, number 82 in Portugal and peaked at number nine in Spain — Cabello's third top ten on the Spanish chart. In the United States, the song did not appear on the Billboard Hot 100 chart, only managing to chart on the US Bubbling Under Hot 100 Singles at number 24.

== Live performances ==
Cabello performed "I Have Questions" as an introduction to "Crying in the Club" at the 2017 Billboard Music Awards on May 21, 2017. Following the event, she performed the whole song during a special encore performance on Xfinity. For this performance, Cabello dressed in white on a dark stage with red petals surrounding her. She also performed the song at the 2017 iHeartRadio Much Music Video Awards, and on Britain's Got Talent on May 31, 2017. Mike Nied of Idolator described it as an "impactful performance that featured strong vocals".

== Credits and personnel ==
Credits were adapted from the liner notes of "Crying in the Club".

Publishing

- Published by Sony/ATV Songs LLC (BMI) O/b/O Sony ATV Music Publishing (UK) Ltd./Maidmetal Limited (PRS)/Milamoon Songs (BMI) // EMI April Music, Inc. (ASCAP) O/b/O itself and Aidenjulius Music (ASCAP) // BMG Gold Songs (ASCAP)/Arjouni Publishing (ASCAP)

Recording and management

- Recorded at the Big Cage, Los Angeles, California
- Mixed at MixStar Studios, Virginia Beach, Virginia
- Mastered at the Mastering Palace, New York City, New York
- Bibi Bourelly appears courtesy of Def Jam Recordings

Personnel

- Camila Cabello – songwriting, lead vocals
- Bibi Bourelly – songwriting, background vocals
- Frank Dukes – additional production
- Serban Ghenea – mixing
- Dave Kutch – mastering
- Jesse Shatkin – songwriting, production, instruments, programming, recording
- John Hanes – engineering
- Sam Dent – additional engineering

== Charts ==
Chart (2017)	Peak position
France Downloads (SNEP)	94
Portugal (AFP)	82
US Bubbling Under Hot 100 (Billboard)	24

== Certifications ==
Region	Certification	Certified units/sales
Brazil (Pro-Música Brasil)	Gold	30,000^{‡}
Canada (Music Canada)	Gold	40,000^{‡}
United States (RIAA)	Gold	500,000^{‡}
^{‡} Sales+streaming figures based on certification alone.

== Release history ==
List of release dates
Region	Date	Format(s)	Version(s)	Label	Ref.
Various	May 22, 2017	Digital download; streaming	Promotional single	Epic; Syco	
United States	June 28, 2017	7-inch EP	B-side of the single "Crying in the Club"	Epic	
