= Never Be the Same (Camila Cabello song) =

2017 single by Camila Cabello

Single by Camila Cabello

from the album Camila
- Released: December 7, 2017
- Studio: Windmark (Santa Monica, California)
- Genre: Electro; dark pop
- Length: 3:47
- Label: Epic; Syco
- Songwriters: Camila Cabello; Adam Feeney; Leo Rami Dawod; Jacob Ludwig Olofsson; Jonnali Parmenius; Alexandra Yatchenko
- Producer: Frank Dukes

Camila Cabello singles chronology
"Havana" (2017)	"Never Be the Same" (2017)	"Sangria Wine" (2018)

Music video
- "Never Be the Same" on YouTube

"Never Be the Same" is a song by American singer and songwriter Camila Cabello from her debut solo album Camila (2018). It was released digitally on December 7, 2017, and sent to US contemporary hit radio on January 9, 2018, as the second single from the album. It was written by Cabello, Noonie Bao, Sasha Sloan, and its producer Frank Dukes, and co-producers Jarami. The song was well-received by critics, who praised Cabello's vocals and lauded its hook.. It was also a commercial success, peaking at number six on the US Billboard Hot 100 and getting a quadruple Platinum certification in the region. It peaked at number one in Croatia, and reached the ten ten in thirteen additional countries, including Australia, Ireland, Portugal and the United Kingdom.

Cabello gave her first televised performance of the song on The Tonight Show Starring Jimmy Fallon in January 2018. The accompanying music video was directed by Grant Singer and was released on March 8, 2018. A duet version of the song, featuring singer Kane Brown, was released on April 27, 2018.

== Background ==
Cabello first performed the song during the B96 Summer Bash '17 on June 24, 2017. It was later included on the set list of her opening act for Bruno Mars' 24K Magic World Tour, firstly titled "I'll Never Be the Same" back then. Cabello wrote the lyrics of the song, inspired by a relationship she had a couple years back. The album includes two versions of the song. The original contains the line, "Nicotine, heroin, morphine" which is substituted in the radio edit version: "Nicotine, rushing me, touching me". On the week of the album release, Billboard reported that, Cabello revealed in a recent interview that she wants to rework one of her songs into a country song with a country singer. Says Joey Arbagey, executive VP of A&R of Epic Records, Sam Hunt was being considered then, but Cabello later chose Kane Brown and it worked out perfectly.

This song has received plenty of praises from many country and pop/rock singers since it was out, including Brown, Keith Urban, Kelsea Ballerini, James Barker from James Barker Band, Demi Lovato, Ellie Rowsell from Wolf Alice and more. (Note: Sources: Keith Urban, Kelsea Ballerini and Demi Lovato; Kane Brown; James Barker from James Barker Band; Ellie Rowsell from Wolf Alice.) Urban and Ballerini also covered the song on Urban's Graffiti U World Tour. Cabello tweeted about her excitement for the cover song along with a clip of the performance.

== Composition and lyrics ==
"Never Be the Same"
The song contained booming drums and echoed effects, which mimicked Hal Blaine's opening drum phrase from The Ronettes' 1963 song "Be My Baby."

"Never Be the Same" has been described as an electro, dark pop ballad. The upbeat track features Cabello singing falsetto in the pre-chorus. According to sheet music published by Sony/ATV Music Publishing on Musicnotes.com, "Never Be the Same" is set in common time at a slow tempo of 65 beats per minute. This song is composed in the key of C major. Cabello's voice ranges from a low of D_{3} to a high of G_{5}, and the music has a C-G-Dm-F chord progression.

The song features booming drums and echoed effects, mimicking Hal Blaine's opening drum phrase from The Ronettes' 1963 song "Be My Baby." The song's lyrics incorporate themes of a pain-is-pleasure type of love. They were described by Neil McCormick of The Daily Telegraph as "a melodrama about addictive love".

== Critical reception ==
Newsday's Glenn Gamboa wrote in his album review, "Cabello is at her peak on ['Never Be the Same'] which shows off what sets her apart from the pop pack. [...] That she can quickly switch to her full voice for the desperate chorus is the mark of a star." In Rolling Stone, Rob Sheffield considered that Cabello "really hits her stride in 'Never Be the Same,' which sounds like Brian Eno's alien-prog masterwork Another Green World souped up into sputtering glitz-pop [...] It's [Cabello] at her best – even at her most tormented, she sounds totally confident and totally herself." In an unfavorable review, Patrick Ryan of USA Today felt the song was "overproduced" with "frequently indecipherable lyrics".

Rolling Stone listed it 4th of "50 Best Songs of 2018", "After the slow-burning piano grind of 'Havana', Camila switches gears for a gigantic electro ballad that proves this girl can handle any kind of song. In 'Never Be The Same', she's an infatuation junkie who can't stop going back to the wrong lover, because she just can't get enough. For the big climax, Camila gasps for breath over the classic 'Be My Baby' drum hook – somewhere, Ronnie Spector must be proud."

=== Accolades ===
Year-end lists
Publication	List	Rank	Ref.
Billboard	The 100 Best Songs of 2018	23	
Rolling Stone	The 50 Best Songs of 2018	4	
Uproxx	The 50 Best Songs of 2018	25	
Rolling Stone	Rob Sheffield’s Top 25 Songs of 2018	2	

Decade-end lists
Publication	List	Rank	Ref.
Rolling Stone	Rob Sheffield’s 50 Best Songs of 2010s	20	
Rolling Stone	100 Best Songs of the 2010s	61	

== Commercial performance ==
"Never Be the Same" entered at number 61 on the US Billboard Hot 100 as the week's top debut on the chart dated December 30, 2017; its debut was spurred by a number five arrival on the Digital Song Sales chart with 30,000 downloads sold as well as 6.1 million streams and 4.5 million in radio audience. It fell to number 98 in its second week, before falling off the chart the following week. The track later re-entered the tally at number 71, following the premiere of the unofficial music video posted on Cabello's personal YouTube channel. "Never Be the Same" climbed to number 65 the week after, and following the release of the parent album and being sent to radio as a single, ascended to number 30 becoming her fourth solo Top 40 entry. It entered the Top 20 seven weeks later at number 19, and it would hover in the region for the next eight weeks. Following the release of the remix, it ascended from number 13 to its peak placement at number six becoming Cabello's third top 10 as a solo artist. The position was accompanied by its crowning of the Digital Song Sales chart with 51,000 downloads, marking Cabello's second consecutive number one the chart after ''Havana''. The track remained on the chart for 37 weeks and has since been certified four-times Platinum by the Recording Industry Association of America (RIAA), denoting sales and streaming units equivalent to four million copies sold. It became her third single to reach number one on the Mainstream Top 40 airplay chart, making Cabello only the sixth solo female to top that chart with the first two singles from her debut album, and her second to lead the Adult Top 40 chart. The track reached number 19 on the Canadian Hot 100 and has since been certified four-times Platinum by Music Canada (MC) for sales and streaming units equivalent to 320,000 units moved.

Outside the US, "Never Be the Same" performed well. The song entered the UK Singles Chart at number 41 on the chart dated December 21, 2017. It rose to number seven in its sixth week, following the release of the album. The song has been certified Platinum by the British Phonographic Industry (BPI) for sales and streams equivalent to 600,000 units. In Ireland and Scotland the track peaked at numbers six and three respectively. Throughout mainland Europe, the track peaked at number four in Portugal, number eight in Greece, number nine in Hungary and Latvia, and inside the Top 40 in the Czech Republic, Austria, Slovakia, Romania, Switzerland, Norway, the Netherlands, Finland, Germany, Poland, Denmark, Slovenia, Slovakia, Spain, and Sweden. The track netted Platinum certifications in Norway, Poland, Portugal, and Switzerland, and Gold certifications in Austria, Denmark, France, Germany, Italy, Spain, and Sweden. "Never Be the Same" enjoyed greater success in Asia and Australasia. In the former, it reached number six in Malaysia and number ten in Singapore. In the latter, it entered the ARIA Charts at number 17 following the release of Camila, before peaking at number seven two weeks later; it spent seventeen weeks on the chart and since has been certified triple Platinum by the ARIA for sales and streaming units equivalent to 210,000. The track performed similarly in New Zealand, where it debuted at number 15 upon the release of the parent album and peaked at number eight, spending sixteen weeks in the top 40.

== Music video ==
An accompanying but unofficial music video for "Never Be the Same" was released on Cabello's personal YouTube channel on December 29, 2017. The video is a montage of real footage, which includes Cabello's infancy, childhood and adolescence. It mainly includes footage from moments she had in 2017, such as receiving awards at the 2017 MTV EMAs and Billboard Women in Music, performing live and also clips from her previous music videos, "Crying in the Club" and "Havana".

The official music video, directed by Grant Singer, was released on March 8, 2018. The video features a mix of professional shots with Cabello wearing couture in various modern landscapes including cliffs, the ocean, and people-sized glass boxes. Cabello is also juxtaposed against amateurish footage of her in a white robe in a hotel room. At the end of the video, she tells the camera man in the hotel room to "Stop, turn it off." Natalie Maher of Billboard believed that Cabello "seems to give all sides of herself in the video", comparing the "retro aesthetic" of the hotel room and the "debonair couture gowns in modern set ups" together. Johnni Macke of People praised the video's concept, stating that "It's modern, funky and very interesting to watch".

== Live performances ==
Cabello gave the first televised performance of the song on The Tonight Show Starring Jimmy Fallon on January 10, 2018. She sung in front of a screen that projected clips of herself, Marilyn Monroe's movie scenes, storms and a variety of landscapes. She also performed the song on Good Morning America, The Ellen DeGeneres Show, Dancing on Ice, Quotidien, and Le Rico Show sur NRJ. In addition, on December 13, 2022, the season finale of The Voice season 22, she performed a duet of the song with her only finalist Morgan Myles.

== Awards and nominations ==
Year	Organization	Award	Result	Ref.
2018	People's Choice Awards	Music Video of 2018	Nominated	
2019	iHeartRadio	Titanium Awards	Won	

== Formats and track listings ==
Digital download
No.	Title	Length
1.	"Never Be the Same"	3:47

Digital download – radio edit
No.	Title	Length
1.	"Never Be the Same" (Radio Edit)	3:47

Digital download – country version
No.	Title	Length
1.	"Never Be the Same" (featuring Kane Brown)	3:45

Streaming
No.	Title	Length
1.	"Never Be the Same"	3:47
2.	"Never Be the Same" (Radio Edit)	3:47

Digital download – live version
No.	Title	Length
1.	"Never Be the Same" (Live)	4:43

== Credits and personnel ==
Credits adapted from the liner notes of Camila.

Recording

- Recorded at Windmark Recording, Santa Monica, California
- Mixed at MixStar Studios, Virginia Beach, Virginia
- Mastered at the Mastering Palace, New York City, New York

Personnel

- Camila Cabello – songwriting, vocals
- Frank Dukes – songwriting, production
- Jarami – songwriting. production
- Noonie Bao – songwriting
- Sasha Sloan – songwriting
- Bart Schoudel – recording
- Serban Ghenea – mixing
- John Hanes – engineering
- Dave Kutch – mastering

== Charts ==
=== Weekly charts ===
Weekly chart performance for "Never Be the Same"
Chart (2017–2018)	Peak position
Australia (ARIA)	7
Austria (Ö3 Austria Top 40)	15
Belgium (Ultratip Bubbling Under Flanders)	1
Belgium (Ultratip Bubbling Under Wallonia)	5
Canada Hot 100 (Billboard)	19
Canada AC (Billboard)	28
Canada CHR/Top 40 (Billboard)	2
Canada Hot AC (Billboard)	2
CIS Airplay (TopHit)	194
Colombia (National-Report)	51
Croatia International Airplay (Top lista)	1
Czech Republic Airplay (ČNS IFPI)	54
Czech Republic Singles Digital (ČNS IFPI)	12
Denmark (Tracklisten)	34
Ecuador (National-Report)	29
Euro Digital Song Sales (Billboard)	7
Estonia (Eesti Tipp-40)	9
Finland (Radiosoittolista)	30
France (SNEP)	56
Germany (GfK)	30
Greece International (IFPI)	8
Hungary (Stream Top 40)	9
Ireland (IRMA)	6
Italy (FIMI)	85
Japan Hot 100 (Billboard)	49
Latvia (LaIPA)	9
Lebanon Airplay (Lebanese Top 20)	9
Malaysia (RIM)	6
Mexico Airplay (Billboard)	7
Netherlands (Global Top 40)	10
Netherlands (Single Top 100)	27
Netherlands (Tipparade)	2
New Zealand (Recorded Music NZ)	8
Norway (VG-lista)	25
Philippines (BillboardPH Hot 100)	63
Poland Airplay (ZPAV)	33
Portugal (AFP)	4
Romania (Airplay 100)	23
Scottish Singles Sales (Official Charts)	3
Singapore (RIAS)	10
Slovakia Airplay (ČNS IFPI)	36
Slovakia Singles Digital (ČNS IFPI)	16
Slovenia (SloTop50)	35
South Korea International (Gaon)	54
Spain (Promusicae)	38
Sweden (Sverigetopplistan)	39
Switzerland (Schweizer Hitparade)	23
UK Singles (Official Charts)	7
US Billboard Hot 100	6
US Adult Contemporary (Billboard)	7
US Adult Pop Airplay (Billboard)	1
US Dance Airplay (Billboard)	4
US Pop Airplay (Billboard)	1
US Rhythmic Airplay (Billboard)	8
Venezuela English (Record Report)	4

=== Year-end charts ===
Annual chart rankings for "Never Be the Same"
Chart (2018)	Position
Australia (ARIA)	34
Canada (Canadian Hot 100)	24
Estonia (Eesti Tipp-40)	73
Netherlands (Global Top 40)	84
New Zealand (Recorded Music NZ)	36
Portugal (AFP)	56
South Korea International (Gaon)	52
UK Singles (OCC)	58
US Billboard Hot 100	18
US Adult Contemporary (Billboard)	17
US Adult Top 40 (Billboard)	11
US Dance/Mix Show Airplay (Billboard)	17
US Mainstream Top 40 (Billboard)	5
US Rhythmic (Billboard)	33

Chart (2019)	Position
US Adult Contemporary (Billboard)	26

== Certifications ==
Region	Certification	Certified units/sales
Australia (ARIA)	3× Platinum	210,000^{‡}
Austria (IFPI Austria)	Gold	15,000^{‡}
Brazil (Pro-Música Brasil)	3× Platinum	120,000^{‡}
Canada (Music Canada)	4× Platinum	320,000^{‡}
Denmark (IFPI Danmark)	Gold	45,000^{‡}
France (SNEP)	Platinum	200,000^{‡}
Germany (BVMI)	Gold	200,000^{‡}
Italy (FIMI)	Gold	25,000^{‡}
Mexico (AMPROFON)	2× Platinum	120,000^{‡}
New Zealand (RMNZ)	3× Platinum	90,000^{‡}
Norway (IFPI Norway)	Platinum	60,000^{‡}
Poland (ZPAV)	Platinum	20,000^{‡}
Portugal (AFP)	Platinum	10,000^{‡}
Spain (Promusicae)	Gold	30,000^{‡}
Switzerland (IFPI Switzerland)	Platinum	20,000^{‡}
United Kingdom (BPI)	Platinum	600,000^{‡}
United States (RIAA)	4× Platinum	4,000,000^{‡}
Streaming
Sweden (GLF)	Gold	4,000,000^{†}
^{‡} Sales+streaming figures based on certification alone.^{†} Streaming-only figures based on certification alone.

== Release history ==
List of release dates, showing region, release format(s), version(s), label(s) and reference(s)
Region	Date	Format(s)	Version(s)	Label(s)	Ref.
Various	December 7, 2017	Digital download; streaming	Original; radio edit	Epic; Syco	
United States	January 9, 2018	Contemporary hit radio	Original; radio edit	Epic	
Australia	January 12, 2018	Contemporary hit radio	Original; radio edit	Sony Music Australia	
Italy	April 13, 2018	Contemporary hit radio	Original; radio edit	Sony	
Various	April 27, 2018	Digital download; streaming	Kane Brown duet	Epic; Syco	
Various	December 20, 2019	Digital download; streaming	Live	Epic; Syco	

== Cover versions ==
=== James Barker Band cover ===
"Never Be the Same"

Song by James Barker Band

from the EP Spotify Singles
- Released: November 7, 2018
- Recorded: 2018
- Studio: Revolution Studios (Toronto, Ontario, Canada)
- Genre: Country
- Length: 4:28
- Label: Universal Canada
- Songwriters: Camila Cabello; Adam Feeney; Leo Rami Dawod; Jacob Ludwig Olofsson; Noonie Bao; Sasha Yatchenko

Music video
- "Never Be the Same" (Camila Cabello cover) on YouTube

On November 7, 2018, the Canadian band James Barker Band released their Spotify Singles live session EP, which is the first-ever Spotify Single to be recorded in Canada and released globally, recorded at Revolution Studios, Toronto, featuring a brand new country cover of "Never Be the Same".

On December 13, 2018, James Barker Band released a music video for their cover of "Never Be the Same". The official music video for James Barker Band's cover of "Never Be the Same" is featuring World of Dance contestants Luka & Jenalyn's emotionally powerful style of dance, filmed in one day at ProdStudio in Toronto, directed by Ben Knechtel with video work by Lee Zavitz.

The lead singer, James Barker, explains the band's connection to Cabello's 2017 hit song and the thought-process behind their version of the track, that they landed on this song because it is just a plain and simple hit, and the chorus melody would have been a hit no matter the genre or generation.

=== Keith Urban and Kelsea Ballerini cover ===
On January 17, 2018, Country singers Keith Urban and Kelsea Ballerini covered the song on Urban's Graffiti U World Tour. Cabello tweeted about her excitement for the cover song along with a clip of the performance.

=== Wolf Alice cover ===
On May 15, 2018, the British four-piece alternative rock band Wolf Alice performed this song on BBC Radio 1's Live Lounge, where lead singer Ellie Rowsell using two different mics to give her vocals some spacey, atmospheric depth. Prior to the performance, Rowsell admitted she "always gets nervous" before these types of gigs, but "you'd never guess it while watching her boldly tackle one of the year's biggest pop hits", as is "Never Be the Same" by Camila Cabello.

== See also ==
- List of Billboard Digital Song Sales number-one singles of 2018
- List of Billboard Adult Top 40 number-one songs of 2018
- List of Billboard Mainstream Top 40 number-one songs of 2018
- List of Billboard Hot 100 top-ten singles in 2018
