= Sangria Wine =

Single by Pharrell Williams and Camila Cabello
- Language: English; Spanish
- Released: May 18, 2018
- Genre: Pop
- Length: 3:22
- Label: Columbia
- Songwriter(s): Pharrell Williams; Camila Cabello; Bianca Landrau
- Producer(s): Pharrell Williams; Camila Cabello

Pharrell Williams singles chronology
"Feels" (2017)	"Sangria Wine" (2018)	"The Mantra" (2018)

Camila Cabello singles chronology
"Never Be the Same" (2018)	"Sangria Wine" (2018)	"Beautiful" (2018)

"Sangria Wine" is a song by American singer-songwriters Pharrell Williams and Camila Cabello, released as a single on May 18, 2018. It was written and produced by the two performers with additional songwriting from Bia.

== Background ==
Williams previously co-wrote and provided background vocals for Cabello's "Havana". "Sangria Wine" was originally recorded for her debut studio album Camila, but did not make the final tracklist. The song, however, is featured on her Never Be the Same Tour setlist. Williams joined Cabello on stage at the Los Angeles concert to perform the then-unreleased track. On May 16, 2018, both artists teased the release of the studio version on their social media pages, posting Polaroid photos of each other with the hashtag "#sangriawine."

== Composition ==
"Sangria Wine" is a salsa-influenced pop song, which also comprises elements of reggae. Cabello sings in English and Spanish on the track. The pre-chorus of the song features lines in Spanish. The chorus sees Williams and Cabello's vocals coming together to sing the title phrase. Lyrically, the track sees the two performers in a "playful" back and forth, with him praising her dance moves and drawing comparisons between them and the beverage. Williams describes the titular dance move in the song's hook.

== Live performances ==
On May 20, 2018, Williams and Cabello gave the first televised performance of the song at the 2018 Billboard Music Awards.

== Credits and personnel ==
Credits adapted from Tidal.

Personnel

- Pharrell Williams – lead vocals, songwriting, production
- Camila Cabello – lead vocals, songwriting, production
- Bia – songwriting
- Brent Paschke – acoustic guitar, electric guitar
- Jesse McGinty – trombone
- Mike Larson – record engineering, editing
- Andrew Coleman – record engineering
- Edwin Carranza – record engineering
- Manny Marroquin – mixing engineering
- Chris Athens – mastering engineering
- Chris Galland – assistant engineering
- Todd Hurtt – assistant engineering
- Scott Desmarais – assistant engineering
- Ben Sedano – assistant engineering
- Madoka Kambe – assistant engineering
- Jacob Dennis – assistant engineering
- Masayuri Hara – assistant engineering
- Robin Florent – assistant engineering
- Thomas Cullison – assistant engineering

== Charts ==
Chart (2018)	Peak position
Belgium (Ultratop 50 Flanders)	45
Canada (Canadian Hot 100)	88
Czech Republic (Singles Digitál Top 100)	48
Croatia (HRT)	37
Greece (IFPI)	19
Hungary (Single Top 40)	32
Hungary (Stream Top 40)	31
Ireland (IRMA)	76
Mexico Airplay (Billboard)	14
New Zealand Heatseekers (RMNZ)	7
Poland (Polish Airplay Top 100)	52
Poland (Dance Top 50)	12
Portugal (AFP)	23
Scotland (OCC)	61
Slovakia (Singles Digitál Top 100)	24
Spain (PROMUSICAE)	85
Sweden Heatseeker (Sverigetopplistan)	2
Switzerland (Schweizer Hitparade)	92
UK Singles (OCC)	84
US Billboard Hot 100	83
US Pop Airplay (Billboard)	40

== Certifications ==
Region	Certification	Certified units/sales
Brazil (Pro-Música Brasil)	Platinum	40,000^{‡}
Mexico (AMPROFON)	Platinum	60,000^{‡}
^{‡} Sales+streaming figures based on certification alone.

== Release history ==
List of release dates, showing region, format(s) and reference(s)
Region	Date	Format	Label	Ref.
Various	May 18, 2018	Digital download	Columbia	
Italy	May 23, 2018	Contemporary hit radio	Sony	
United States	June 5, 2018	Contemporary hit radio	Columbia	
