= Crying in the Club =

2017 single by Camila Cabello

Single by Camila Cabello
- B-side: "I Have Questions"
- Released: May 19, 2017
- Recorded: 2016
- Genre: Pop; dance; tropical
- Length: 3:36
- Label: Epic; Syco
- Composers: Camila Cabello; Benjamin Levin; Nathan Pérez; Sia Kate Isobelle Furler; David Frank; Steve Kipner; Pamela Sheyne
- Lyricist: Sia Kate Isobelle Furler
- Producers: Benny Blanco; Cashmere Cat; Happy Perez

Camila Cabello singles chronology
"Hey Ma" (2017)	"Crying in the Club" (2017)	"Know No Better" (2017)

Music video
- "Crying in the Club" on YouTube

"Crying in the Club" is the debut solo single by American singer and songwriter Camila Cabello. It was released on May 19, 2017, by Epic Records and Syco. It was written by Cabello, Sia, Benny Blanco, and Happy Perez, with production handled by Blanco, Perez, and Cashmere Cat. The song contains an interpolation of Christina Aguilera's 1999 single "Genie in a Bottle". A mid-tempo tropical pop and dance track, it was originally intended to be the lead single from Cabello's debut studio album, which was originally titled The Hurting. The Healing. The Loving. It was later removed from the track listing and featured on Side A of the 7-inch eponymous extended play released on July 14, 2017.

The song reached number three in Bulgaria, as well as the top forty in eleven additional countries. "Crying in the Club" is certified Platinum in the United States, the United Kingdom, Canada, Australia, and Italy. It is Cabello's first completely solo single since her departure from American girl group Fifth Harmony.

== Background and release ==
Cabello previously collaborated with producers Benny Blanco and Cashmere Cat on the latter's song "Love Incredible", recorded in May 2016. Following Cabello's departure from the girl group Fifth Harmony, and after years of writing in her downtime, she began writing songs in earnest for her debut. In November 2016, during a writing session with Blanco, Australian singer-songwriter Sia conceived the concept for a demo, and both composed the song. After Blanco offered her "Crying in the Club", Cabello rewrote the song's bridge and recorded the track. "It had a message about healing through the power of music", she said later, "That theme was a key part of what I wanted for my album." "Crying in the Club" was set to be the lead single of Cabello's debut studio album, Camila, originally titled The Hurting. The Healing. The Loving..

The song was released on May 19, 2017, to digital music stores and streaming services, following several music collaborations by Cabello, including "Bad Things" with Machine Gun Kelly–which reached the top 10 on several Billboard charts. "Crying in the Club" was serviced to US contemporary hit radio on May 23, 2017. It was later featured on the Side A of the 7-inch eponymous extended play released on July 14, 2017.

== Composition ==
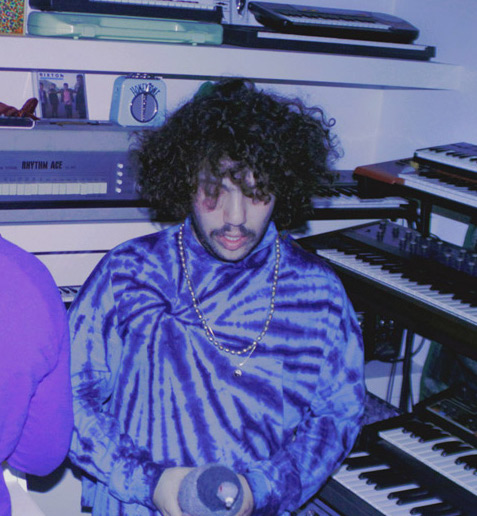
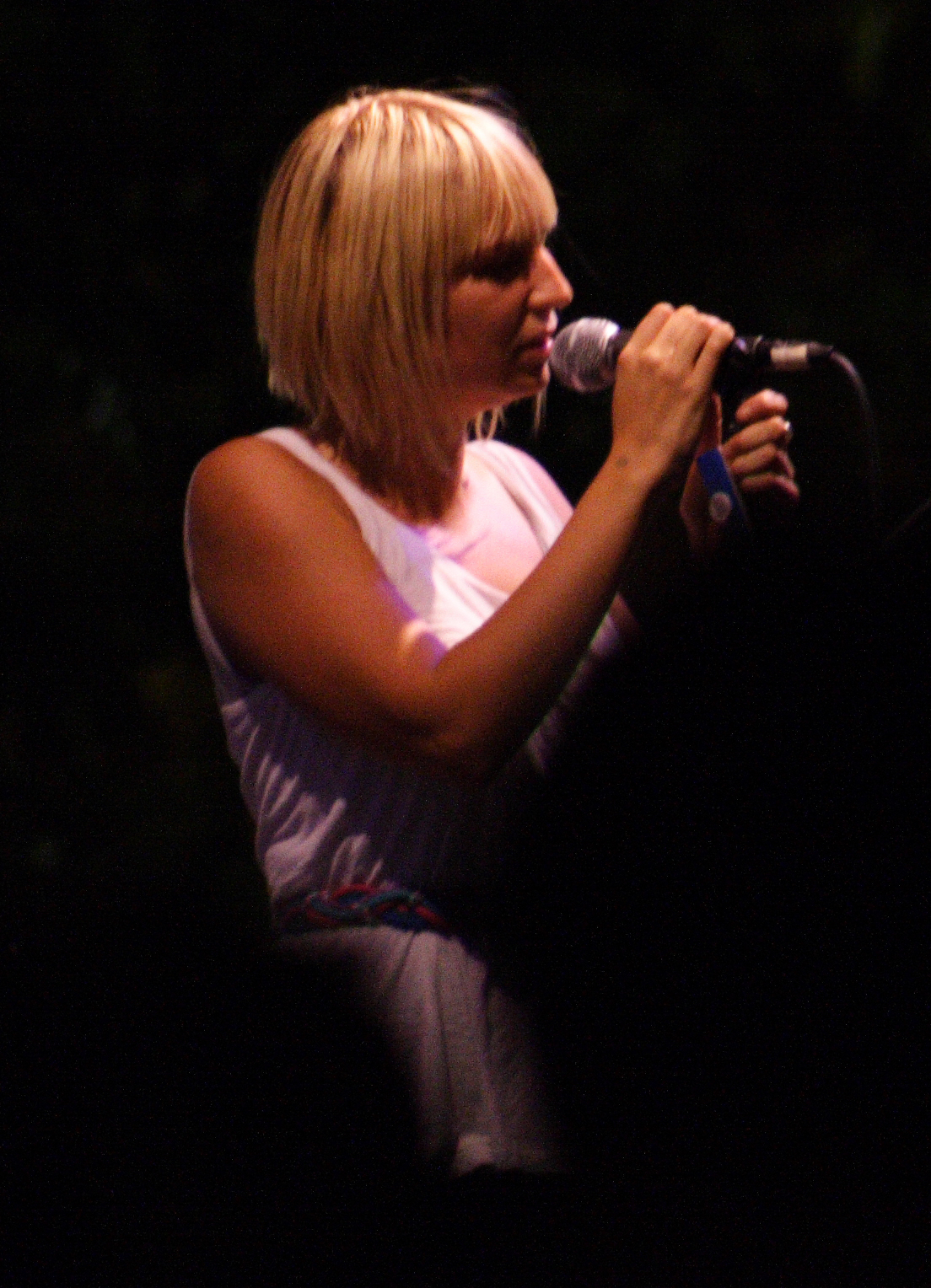
Benny Blanco (left) and Sia (right) contributed to the songwriting.

"Crying in the Club" is a mid-tempo pop and dance track featuring a "subdued" minor-key dance groove and dancehall-inspired beat. Some critics described it as a tropical track. Lyrically, the song contains themes of the healing powers of music and dancing your heartbreak away. The song interpolates Christina Aguilera's "Genie in a Bottle", written by David Frank, Steve Kipner and Pamela Sheyne. The song is written in the key of F♯ minor, with Cabello's vocals spanning from the low note of E_{3} to the high belted note of F♯_{5}.

== Critical reception ==
Writing for Billboard, Joe Lynch opined the song "demonstrates just enough vocal flair for the former Fifth Harmony star to escape the more generic tropes of top 40," while in Rolling Stone, Ryan Reed noted Cabello "finds emotional redemption" in the song. Editors from Rap-Up wrote "the song blends island flavors with intense pop sounds, making it a dance-ready soundtrack for optimism." Anna Gaca of Spin described the song as a "dancehall-inspired beat that bears a passing resemblance to Sia's 'Cheap Thrills'." Idolator writer Mike Wass called the song a "moody, mid-tempo bop", and opined, "the 20-year-old followed Sia's demo a little too closely. She's almost unrecognizable and that's worrying for something trying to establish their independence."

=== Year-end lists ===
Publication	Accolade	Rank	Ref.
Fact	The 50 Best Tracks of 2017	17	
Popjustice	The Top 45 Singles of 2017: The Leftovers	12	

== Music video ==
Directed by Emil Nava, the song's accompanying music video was released on May 19, 2017. The clip opens in black and white with Cabello standing against a brick wall, dancing through the fog and soaking in a tub as she performs the song "I Have Questions", before transitioning into the song itself with the singer dancing in a crowded club. The video has received positive reviews. Writing for Billboard, Gil Kaufman related the concept to Dr Jekyll and Mr Hyde. In Rolling Stone, Ryan Reed opined the video "mirrors the song's emotional journey. It opens with black-and-white shots of the singer crying and reclining in a bathtub before exploding with color in the nightclub."

== Live performances ==
Cabello performed the song live for the first time at the 2017 Billboard Music Awards on May 21. The singer started her performance by singing "I Have Questions" before transitioning into "Crying in the Club". Wearing sparkly gold attire, Cabello danced amid male backup dancers and drummers as fires burned behind them. The singer also performed the song on Britain's Got Talent on May 31, and at the 2017 iHeartRadio Much Music Video Awards on June 18. Cabello delivered a "stripped-back" acoustic rendition on The Tonight Show Starring Jimmy Fallon on June 22. Idolator's Mike Wass considered it "her best live performance yet."

== Cover versions ==
Niall Horan performed "Crying in the Club" as a pop-rock jam on guitar during his Flicker World Tour. It received nomination from the iHeartRadio Music Awards in 2019 for Best Cover Song.

== Track listings ==
Digital download

1. Crying in the Club – 3:36

=== Crying in the Club (7-inch EP) ===
Side A

1. Crying in the Club – 3:36

Side B

1. I Have Questions – 3:42

== Charts ==
=== Weekly charts ===
Weekly chart performance
Chart (2017)	Peak position
Australia (ARIA)	39
Austria (Ö3 Austria Top 40)	49
Belgium (Ultratop 50 Flanders)	43
Belgium (Ultratip Bubbling Under Wallonia)	15
Bulgaria (PROPHON)	3
Canada (Canadian Hot 100)	31
Czech Republic Singles Digital (ČNS IFPI)	31
Finland Downloads (Latauslista)	20
France Downloads (SNEP)	49
Germany (GfK)	49
Hungary (Single Top 40)	40
Hungary (Stream Top 40)	30
Ireland (IRMA)	17
Italy (FIMI)	62
Lebanon (Lebanese Top 20)	10
Netherlands (Single Top 100)	54
New Zealand Heatseekers (RMNZ)	2
Philippines (Philippine Hot 100)	86
Portugal (AFP)	13
Romania (Airplay 100)	97
Scottish Singles Sales (Official Charts)	15
Slovakia Airplay (ČNS IFPI)	71
Slovakia Singles Digital (ČNS IFPI)	27
Spain (Promusicae)	50
Spain Digital Song Sales (Billboard)	9
Sweden (Sverigetopplistan)	58
Switzerland (Schweizer Hitparade)	45
UK Singles (Official Charts)	12
US Billboard Hot 100	47
US Adult Pop Airplay (Billboard)	39
US Pop Airplay (Billboard)	19
US Rhythmic Airplay (Billboard)	33

=== Year-end charts ===
Year-end chart performance
Chart (2017)	Position
Brazil (Pro-Música Brasil)	167
Hungary (Stream Top 40)	99
Portugal (AFP)	84
UK Singles (Official Charts Company)	79

== Certifications ==
List of certifications and sales
Region	Certification	Certified units/sales
Australia (ARIA)	Platinum	70,000^{‡}
Brazil (Pro-Música Brasil)	3× Platinum	180,000^{‡}
Canada (Music Canada)	2× Platinum	160,000^{‡}
Denmark (IFPI Danmark)	Gold	45,000^{‡}
France (SNEP)	Gold	100,000^{‡}
Germany (BVMI)	Gold	200,000^{‡}
Italy (FIMI)	Platinum	50,000^{‡}
Mexico (AMPROFON)	Gold	30,000^{‡}
New Zealand (RMNZ)	Platinum	30,000^{‡}
Norway (IFPI Norway)	Platinum	60,000^{‡}
Poland (ZPAV)	Platinum	20,000^{‡}
Portugal (AFP)	Platinum	10,000^{‡}
Spain (Promusicae)	Gold	30,000^{‡}
Switzerland (IFPI Switzerland)	Platinum	20,000^{‡}
United Kingdom (BPI)	Platinum	600,000^{‡}
United States (RIAA)	Platinum	1,000,000^{‡}
Streaming
Sweden (GLF)	Gold	4,000,000^{†}
^{‡} Sales+streaming figures based on certification alone.^{†} Streaming-only figures based on certification alone.

== Release history ==
List of release dates and formats
Region	Date	Format(s)	Label(s)	Ref.
Various	May 19, 2017	Digital download; streaming	Epic; Syco	
United States	May 23, 2017	Contemporary hit radio	Epic	
United States	May 23, 2017	Rhythmic contemporary	Epic	
United States	July 14, 2017	7-inch EP	Epic	
