= Side to Side =

2016 single by Ariana Grande featuring Nicki Minaj

Single by Ariana Grande featuring Nicki Minaj

from the album Dangerous Woman
- Released: August 30, 2016
- Recorded: May 2015
- Studio: MXM (Stockholm)
- Genre: Reggae-pop; dancehall
- Length: 3:46
- Label: Republic
- Songwriters: Max Martin; Savan Kotecha; Alexander Kronlund; Ilya Salmanzadeh; Onika Maraj; Ariana Grande
- Producers: Max Martin; Ilya

Ariana Grande singles chronology
"Into You" (2016)	"Side to Side" (2016)	"My Favorite Part" (2016)

Nicki Minaj singles chronology
"Do You Mind" (2016)	"Side to Side" (2016)	"Run Up" (2017)

Music video
- "Side to Side" on YouTube

"Side to Side" is a song by the American singer-songwriter Ariana Grande featuring Trinidadian rapper Nicki Minaj. It was released on August 30, 2016, by Republic Records as the third single from Grande's third album Dangerous Woman. The artists wrote the reggae-pop song alongside Savan Kotecha, Alexander Kronlund, and producers Max Martin and Ilya.

"Side to Side" peaked at number 4 on both the US Billboard Hot 100 and the UK Singles Chart, becoming her first top-five single from Dangerous Woman in the former and first top-ten single from the album in the latter. It also reached number 4 on the Canadian Hot 100, number 3 on the Australian chart and number 2 in the New Zealand chart. It is her second single to top the US Mainstream Top 40 airplay chart. The single has sold 1.1 million copies as of 2018 in the country, and has been certified sextuple platinum by the Recording Industry Association of America (RIAA) for additional equivalent units.

Its music video, directed by Hannah Lux Davis, made its premiere on American clothing brand Guess's website on August 28, 2016, and features Grande in a gym and frolicking with shirtless men in a sauna together with Minaj. The music video has since received a nomination at the 2017 MTV Video Music Awards for Best Choreography. Grande and Minaj performed "Side to Side" at the 2016 MTV Video Music Awards and the American Music Awards. Grande has also promoted the song with televised performances on The Tonight Show Starring Jimmy Fallon and on The Ellen DeGeneres Show.

== Background and composition ==
On May 13, 2016, Grande announced on her Instagram account that a new song from her album Dangerous Woman would be premiered exclusively on Apple Music every day until the release of the album. The following day, Grande posted a short preview of "Side to Side" via Instagram, then premiered the song on Apple Music the same day. On August 30, 2016, the track was sent to US rhythmic contemporary radio and urban contemporary radio and became Dangerous Woman's third single.

"Side to Side"
A sound sample of the reggae-pop song "Side to Side", featuring rapper and singer Nicki Minaj. The sample shows Grande singing the chorus accompanied by a guitar, snaps and drums. Lyrically, "Side to Side" talks about soreness after sex.

The song was written by Max Martin, Savan Kotecha, Alexander Kronlund, Ilya Salmanzadeh, Grande and Minaj. Martin was also responsible for production, along with Salmanzadeh, as well as programming, drums, percussion, guitars, bass and keyboard. The background vocal was provided by Kotecha, Chonita Gilbert, Joi Gilliam and Taura Stinson. It was recorded at MXM Studios in Los Angeles, California and Wolf Cousins Studios in Stockholm, Sweden while Minaj's verses were recorded at Glenwood Place Studios in Burbank, California and MilkBoy the Studio in Philadelphia, Pennsylvania. "Side to Side" is written in the key of F♯ minor with a common time tempo of 159 (or 79.5) beats per minute. Grande's vocals span two octaves, from the low note of F♯_{3} to the mixed note of F♯_{5}.

The song is a reggae-pop and dancehall song complemented with R&B influences with a duration of three minutes and forty-six seconds (3:46). Lyrically, "Side to Side" describes a feeling of soreness after sex. In an interview to MTV News reporter Gaby Wilson, Grande explained "that whole song is about riding leading to soreness". Deepa Lakshmin from MTV noted that when Minaj says the words "bicycle" and "tricycle", "she's rapping about something a bit more risqué than your standard gym workout."

== Critical reception ==
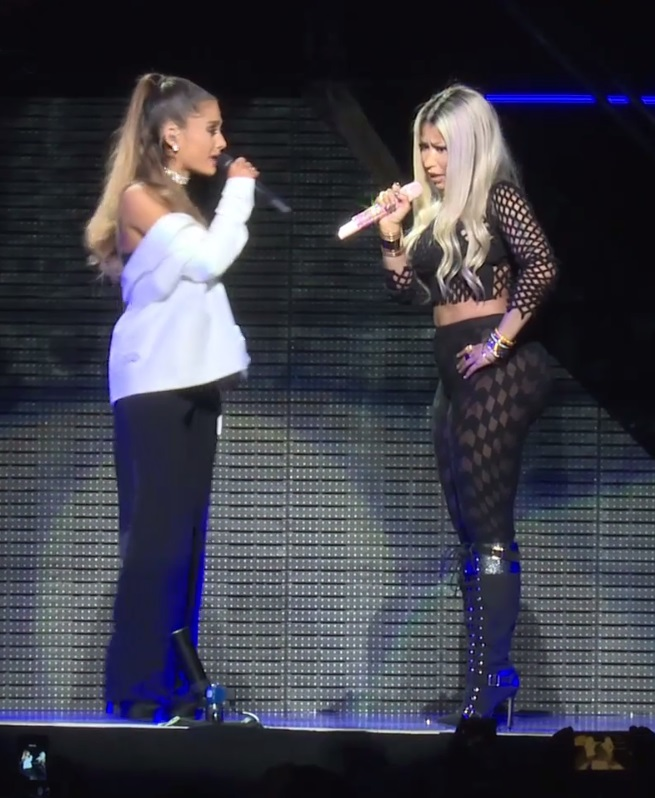
Rapper Nicki Minaj (right) and Grande (left) have collaborated multiple times; Minaj was also praised for her verse and featured in the music video for the song.

Stephen Thomas Erlewine of AllMusic noted that the song's sound is comparable to works from Barbadian singer Rihanna. Maeve McDermott from USA Today also noted the similarities and wrote, "Grande borrows the tropical flavors and ska upstrumming that Rihanna ushered into pop music's consciousness." She went on to praise Minaj's participation, writing, "Who better to invite on an album about female fierceness than Nicki Minaj, whose understated verse steals the show and lends Grande some real danger."

Rolling Stone's writer Rob Sheffield ranked "Side to Side" at number 22 on his list of "50 Best Songs of 2016", describing it as "an ode to having so much sex you can't walk straight the next day."

== Commercial performance ==
Following the performance at the 2016 MTV Video Music Awards on August 28, 2016, "Side to Side" made its official debut in the United States at number 31 on the Billboard Hot 100 chart issue dated September 17, 2016. The song leaped to number 18 the next week. After six weeks on the chart, the song hiked up 12–10 on the Hot 100 issue dated October 29, 2016, marking Grande's eighth top-ten entry on the chart and Minaj's thirteenth; it also doubles as the second top-ten single from Dangerous Woman. The song later reached a peak of number four on the chart dating December 3, 2016, where it stayed for two non-consecutive weeks, becoming the highest-charting single from the album. The song stayed in the Hot 100's top ten for fourteen weeks of its chart run, dropping out of the region on January 28, 2017. The song also spent five weeks atop the Billboard Mainstream Top 40 airplay chart, becoming Grande's second career number-one there following "Problem" in 2014, and Minaj's first ever. As of June 2020, "Side to Side" has sold 1.17 million copies in the country.

In Australia, "Side to Side" debuted at number 36 on the ARIA Charts and has since peaked at number three, becoming her fourth top-ten single there. In New Zealand, the song debuted at number ten, becoming her fifth top-ten single there. It rose to number five the following week and later peaked at number two.

In the United Kingdom, "Side to Side" initially debuted on the UK Singles Chart at number 66 in the week dated June 2, 2016 due to strong digital downloads from the parent album's release, but fell off the chart the following week. The song later re-entered the chart at number 24 on the week dated September 9, 2016 following its official release as a single, and has since peaked at number four, earning Grande her fourth top-ten single in the nation, and Minaj's tenth. As of March 2021, "Side to Side" is Grande's fifth most-streamed song in the United Kingdom and overall 37th most-streamed song by a female artist in the country.

== Music video ==
Directed by Hannah Lux Davis, the music video made its official premiere on American clothing brand Guess' website on the night of August 28, 2016. The music video opens with Grande leading a spin class on stationary bicycles, performing a synchronized choreography with backup dancers. The video then transitions to a gym and locker room scene, where Grande and the backup dancers are seen with boxing equipment. Grande and Minaj are then seen in a sauna, surrounded by male models. The video featured product placement from Guess.

The music video received a nomination at the 2017 MTV Video Music Awards for Best Choreography.

== Live performances ==
Grande performed "Side to Side" for the first time in "Vevo Presents" show in May 2016. Later, she performed at the 2016 MTV Video Music Awards with Minaj. Stationary bicycles and a pommel horse were featured as props in the performance. Grande also performed the song on The Tonight Show Starring Jimmy Fallon on September 8, 2016. Additionally, she performed the single in an acoustic medley with "Into You" on The Ellen DeGeneres Show on September 14, 2016. On September 24, 2016, she performed the song at the 2016 iHeartRadio Music Festival on The CW. On November 20, 2016, Grande and Minaj performed "Side to Side" at the 2016 American Music Awards. It was named the best performance of the night by editor Andrew Unterberger from Billboard. On June 4, 2017, the song was part of Grande's set list for One Love Manchester, a benefit concert for the victims of the Manchester Arena bombing. Minaj has performed the song on the setlist of her 2019 Europe tour, The Nicki Wrld Tour. Similarly, Grande has performed the song on the Dangerous Woman Tour, the Sweetener World Tour and at Coachella Valley Music and Arts Festival, along with Minaj at the latter.

== Usage in media ==
The song was featured in a T-Mobile commercial which also featured Grande.

It was also played in the television show Crashing, and is featured in the 2017 dance rhythm game, Just Dance 2018.

== Track listing ==
Digital download – remixes
No.	Title	Length
1.	"Side to Side" (featuring Nicki Minaj) (Slushii remix)	3:22
2.	"Side to Side" (featuring Nicki Minaj) (Phantoms remix)	4:16

== Credits and personnel ==
Credits adapted from Dangerous Woman's liner notes.

Recording

- Recorded at MXM Studios and Wolf Cousins Studios (Stockholm, Sweden)
- Minaj's verses recorded at Glenwood Place Studios (Burbank, California) and MilkBoy the Studio (Philadelphia, Pennsylvania)
- Mixed at MixStar Studios (Virginia Beach, Virginia)
- Mastered at Sterling Sound (New York City, New York)

Management

- Published by MXM (ASCAP) — administered by Kobalt (ASCAP), Wolf Cousins (STIM), Warner/Chappell Music (STIM), Harajuku Barbie Music/Money Mack Music/Songs of Universal, Inc. (BMI) and Grandefinale LLC
- Nicki Minaj appears courtesy of Cash Money Records

Personnel

- Ariana Grande – lead vocals, songwriting
- Nicki Minaj – featured vocals, songwriting
- Max Martin – songwriting, production, programming, keyboard, guitar, bass, percussion
- Savan Kotecha – songwriting, backing vocals
- Ilya Salmanzadeh – songwriting, production, programming, keyboard, guitar, bass, percussion
- Alexander Kronlund – songwriting
- Chonita Gilbert – backing vocals
- Joi Gilliam – backing vocals
- Taura Stinson – backing vocals
- Serban Ghenea – mixing
- Sam Holland – engineering
- John Hanes – mixing engineering
- Joel Metzler – assistant engineering
- Jordan Silva – assistant engineering
- Tom Coyne – mastering
- Aya Merrill – mastering
- Wendy Goldstein – A&R
- Scooter Braun – A&R

== Charts ==
=== Weekly charts ===
Chart (2016–2017)	Peak position
Argentina Anglo (Monitor Latino)	16
Australia (ARIA)	3
Austria (Ö3 Austria Top 40)	22
Belgium (Ultratop 50 Flanders)	23
Belgium (Ultratop 50 Wallonia)	15
Bulgaria International (PROPHON)	9
Canada Hot 100 (Billboard)	4
Canada CHR/Top 40 (Billboard)	1
Canada Hot AC (Billboard)	20
CIS Airplay (TopHit)	66
Czech Republic Airplay (ČNS IFPI)	38
Czech Republic Singles Digital (ČNS IFPI)	10
Denmark (Tracklisten)	13
Europe (Euro Digital Songs)	9
Finland Download (Latauslista)	30
France (SNEP)	66
Germany (GfK)	24
Greece Digital Songs (Billboard)	1
Hungary (Dance Top 40)	13
Hungary (Rádiós Top 40)	14
Hungary (Single Top 40)	6
Ireland (IRMA)	5
Israel International Airplay (Media Forest)	8
Italy (FIMI)	28
Japan Hot 100 (Billboard)	74
Lebanon (OLT20)	9
Mexico (Billboard Mexican Airplay)	24
Netherlands (Dutch Top 40)	11
Netherlands (Single Top 100)	11
New Zealand (Recorded Music NZ)	2
Norway (VG-lista)	8
Paraguay (Monitor Latino)	18
Poland Airplay (ZPAV)	11
Portugal (AFP)	10
Romania Airplay (Media Forest)	9
Russia Airplay (TopHit)	71
Scottish Singles Sales (Official Charts)	7
Slovakia Airplay (ČNS IFPI)	73
Slovakia Singles Digital (ČNS IFPI)	10
South Korea International (Gaon Digital Chart)	22
Spain (Promusicae)	26
Sweden (Sverigetopplistan)	13
Switzerland (Schweizer Hitparade)	21
UK Singles (Official Charts)	4
US Billboard Hot 100	4
US Adult Pop Airplay (Billboard)	16
US Dance Club Songs (Billboard)	13
US Dance Airplay (Billboard)	1
US Latin Pop Airplay (Billboard)	38
US Pop Airplay (Billboard)	1
US Rhythmic Airplay (Billboard)	2
Venezuela Anglo (Record Report)	1

=== Year-end charts ===
Chart (2016)	Position
Australia (ARIA)	37
Canada (Canadian Hot 100)	55
Germany (Official German Charts)	96
Hungary (Single Top 40)	66
Netherlands (Dutch Top 40)	52
Netherlands (Single Top 100)	75
New Zealand (Recorded Music NZ)	45
Spain (PROMUSICAE)	93
Sweden (Sverigetopplistan)	95
UK Singles (Official Charts Company)	49
US Billboard Hot 100	77
Chart (2017)	Position
Argentina (Monitor Latino)	90
Brazil (Pro-Música Brasil)	79
Canada (Canadian Hot 100)	46
Hungary (Dance Top 40)	27
US Billboard Hot 100	43
US Dance/Mix Show Airplay (Billboard)	28
US Mainstream Top 40 (Billboard)	16
US Rhythmic (Billboard)	29
Chart (2018)	Position
Hungary (Dance Top 40)	94
South Korea International (Gaon)	35

== Certifications and sales ==
Region	Certification	Certified units/sales
Australia (ARIA)	7× Platinum	490,000^{‡}
Austria (IFPI Austria)	Platinum	30,000^{‡}
Belgium (BRMA)	Gold	10,000^{‡}
Brazil (Pro-Música Brasil)	3× Diamond	750,000^{‡}
Canada (Music Canada)	8× Platinum	640,000^{‡}
Denmark (IFPI Danmark)	2× Platinum	180,000^{‡}
France (SNEP)	Platinum	133,333^{‡}
Germany (BVMI)	Platinum	400,000^{‡}
Hungary (MAHASZ)	Gold	1,500^{‡}
Italy (FIMI)	2× Platinum	100,000^{‡}
New Zealand (RMNZ)	5× Platinum	150,000^{‡}
Norway (IFPI Norway)	3× Platinum	180,000^{‡}
Poland (ZPAV)	4× Platinum	80,000^{‡}
Portugal (AFP)	2× Platinum	20,000^{‡}
South Korea (Gaon)	—	352,195
Spain (Promusicae)	2× Platinum	120,000^{‡}
Switzerland (IFPI Switzerland)	Platinum	30,000^{‡}
United Kingdom (BPI)	3× Platinum	1,800,000^{‡}
United States (RIAA)	8× Platinum	8,000,000^{‡}
Streaming
Sweden (GLF)	3× Platinum	24,000,000^{†}
^{‡} Sales+streaming figures based on certification alone.^{†} Streaming-only figures based on certification alone.

== Release history ==
Release dates and formats for "Side to Side"
Region	Date	Format	Version(s)	Label	Ref.
United States	May 14, 2016 (Note: Released exclusively on Apple Music.)	Streaming	Original	Republic	
United States	August 30, 2016	Rhythmic contemporary radio; urban contemporary radio	Original	Republic	
United States	September 20, 2016	Contemporary hit radio	Original	Republic	
Italy	October 7, 2016	Radio airplay	Original	Universal	
Various	February 3, 2017	Digital download	Remixes	Republic	

== See also ==
- Billboard Year-End Hot 100 singles of 2016
- Billboard Year-End Hot 100 singles of 2017
- List of Billboard Hot 100 top-ten singles in 2016
- List of Billboard Hot 100 top-ten singles in 2017
- List of Billboard Mainstream Top 40 number-one songs of 2016
- List of Billboard Mainstream Top 40 number-one songs of 2017
- List of best-selling singles in the United States
