= List of Billboard Mainstream Top 40 number-one songs of 2017 =

This is a list of songs which reached number one on the Billboard Mainstream Top 40 (or Pop Songs) chart in 2017.

During 2017, a total of 18 singles hit number-one on the charts.

== Chart history ==
Key
†	Indicates best-performing single of 2017

Issue date	Song	Artist(s)	Ref.
January 7	"Side to Side"	Ariana Grande featuring Nicki Minaj	
January 14	"Side to Side"	Ariana Grande featuring Nicki Minaj	
January 21	"Side to Side"	Ariana Grande featuring Nicki Minaj	
January 28	"Don't Wanna Know"	Maroon 5 featuring Kendrick Lamar	
February 4	"Scars to Your Beautiful"	Alessia Cara	
February 11	"Scars to Your Beautiful"	Alessia Cara	
February 18	"Bad Things"	Machine Gun Kelly and Camila Cabello	
February 25	"Bad Things"	Machine Gun Kelly and Camila Cabello	
March 4	"Shape of You"	Ed Sheeran	
March 11	"Shape of You"	Ed Sheeran	
March 18	"Shape of You"	Ed Sheeran	
March 25	"Shape of You"	Ed Sheeran	
April 1	"Shape of You"	Ed Sheeran	
April 8	"Shape of You"	Ed Sheeran	
April 15	"Shape of You"	Ed Sheeran	
April 22	"Shape of You"	Ed Sheeran	
April 29	"Shape of You"	Ed Sheeran	
May 6	"That's What I Like"	Bruno Mars	
May 13	"That's What I Like"	Bruno Mars	
May 20	"That's What I Like"	Bruno Mars	
May 27	"Something Just Like This"	The Chainsmokers and Coldplay	
June 3	"Something Just Like This"	The Chainsmokers and Coldplay	
June 10	"Stay"	Zedd and Alessia Cara	
June 17	"Stay"	Zedd and Alessia Cara	
June 24	"Stay"	Zedd and Alessia Cara	
July 1	"Stay"	Zedd and Alessia Cara	
July 8	"Stay"	Zedd and Alessia Cara	
July 15	"Stay"	Zedd and Alessia Cara	
July 22	"Despacito"	Luis Fonsi and Daddy Yankee featuring Justin Bieber	
July 29	"Despacito"	Luis Fonsi and Daddy Yankee featuring Justin Bieber	
August 5	"Despacito"	Luis Fonsi and Daddy Yankee featuring Justin Bieber	
August 12	"Despacito"	Luis Fonsi and Daddy Yankee featuring Justin Bieber	
August 19	"Despacito"	Luis Fonsi and Daddy Yankee featuring Justin Bieber	
August 26	"There's Nothing Holdin' Me Back"	Shawn Mendes	
September 2	"There's Nothing Holdin' Me Back"	Shawn Mendes	
September 9	"Attention"	Charlie Puth	
September 16	"Attention"	Charlie Puth	
September 23	"Attention"	Charlie Puth	
September 30	"Attention"	Charlie Puth	
October 7	"Slow Hands"	Niall Horan	
October 14	"Strip That Down"	Liam Payne featuring Quavo	
October 21	"Strip That Down"	Liam Payne featuring Quavo	
October 28	"Look What You Made Me Do"	Taylor Swift	
November 4	"Sorry Not Sorry"	Demi Lovato	
November 11	"Feel It Still"	Portugal. The Man	
November 18	"Feel It Still"	Portugal. The Man	
November 25	"Feel It Still"	Portugal. The Man	
December 2	"Thunder"	Imagine Dragons	
December 9	"Havana"	Camila Cabello featuring Young Thug	
December 16	"Havana"	Camila Cabello featuring Young Thug	
December 23	"Havana"	Camila Cabello featuring Young Thug	
December 30	"Havana"	Camila Cabello featuring Young Thug	

== See also ==
- 2017 in American music
