= List of number-one singles of 2017 (Slovenia) =

SloTop50 singles 2017
Winners
- Most weeks at No. 1: "Shape of You" & "Galway Girl"
- Year End No. 1: "Shape of You"

List of the Slovenian number-one singles of 2017 compiled by SloTop50, is the official chart provider of Slovenia. SloTop50 publishes weekly charts once a week, every Sunday. Chart contain data generated by the SloTop50 system according to any song played during the period starting the previous Monday morning at time 00:00:00 and ending Sunday night at 23:59:59.

== Charts ==
=== Number-one singles by week ===
Weekly charted #1 songs and highest charted counting among domestic songs only

†	Indicates best-performing single of 2017

No.	Week	Issue date	Number one	Artist	Top domestic song	Top domestic artist
52	210	8 January 2017	"Love My Life"	Robbie Williams	"Milijon in ena"	Klara Jazbec
re	211	15 January 2017	"Human"	Rag'n'Bone Man	"Oba"	Manca Špik & Isaac Palma
re	212	22 January 2017	"Human"	Rag'n'Bone Man	"Milijon in ena"	Klara Jazbec
re	213	29 January 2017	"Love My Life"	Robbie Williams	"Oba"	Manca Špik & Isaac Palma
re	214	5 February 2017	"Lost on You"	LP	"Milijon in ena"	Klara Jazbec
re	215	12 February 2017	"Lost on You"	LP	"Milijon in ena"	Klara Jazbec
53	216	19 February 2017	"Rockabye"	Clean Bandit ft. Sean Paul & Anne-Marie	"Milijon in ena"	Klara Jazbec
re	217	26 February 2017	"Love My Life"	Robbie Williams	"Milijon in ena"	Klara Jazbec
54	218	5 March 2017	"Heart of Gold"	BQL	"Heart of Gold"	BQL
55	219	12 March 2017	"Shape of You" †	Ed Sheeran	"Heart of Gold"	BQL
55	220	19 March 2017	"Shape of You" †	Ed Sheeran	"Heart of Gold"	BQL
55	221	26 March 2017	"Shape of You" †	Ed Sheeran	"Heart of Gold"	BQL
55	222	2 April 2017	"Shape of You" †	Ed Sheeran	"Heart of Gold"	BQL
55	223	9 April 2017	"Shape of You" †	Ed Sheeran	"Heart of Gold"	BQL
55	224	16 April 2017	"Shape of You" †	Ed Sheeran	"Heart of Gold"	BQL
re	225	23 April 2017	"Heart of Gold"	BQL	"Heart of Gold"	BQL
re	226	30 April 2017	"Shape of You" †	Ed Sheeran	"Heart of Gold"	BQL
re	227	7 May 2017	"Heart of Gold"	BQL	"Heart of Gold"	BQL
56	228	14 May 2017	"Despacito"	Luis Fonsi feat. Daddy Yankee	"Heart of Gold"	BQL
56	229	21 May 2017	"Despacito"	Luis Fonsi feat. Daddy Yankee	"Halo"	Alya
56	230	28 May 2017	"Despacito"	Luis Fonsi feat. Daddy Yankee	"Halo"	Alya
re	231	4 June 2017	"Shape of You" †	Ed Sheeran	"Halo"	Alya
57	232	11 June 2017	"Súbeme la Radio"	E. Iglesias ft. D. Bueno and Zion & Lennox	"Halo"	Alya
re	233	18 June 2017	"Shape of You" †	Ed Sheeran	"Halo"	Alya
re	234	25 June 2017	"Shape of You" †	Ed Sheeran	"Heart of Gold"	BQL
re	235	2 July 2017	"Shape of You" †	Ed Sheeran	"Halo"	Alya
re	236	9 July 2017	"Súbeme la Radio"	E. Iglesias ft. D. Bueno and Zion & Lennox	"Heart of Gold"	BQL
re	237	16 July 2017	"Súbeme la Radio"	E. Iglesias ft. D. Bueno and Zion & Lennox	"Halo"	Alya
re	238	23 July 2017	"Súbeme la Radio"	E. Iglesias ft. D. Bueno and Zion & Lennox	"Heart of Gold"	BQL
58	239	30 July 2017	"Galway Girl"	Ed Sheeran	"Halo"	Alya
58	240	6 August 2017	"Galway Girl"	Ed Sheeran	"Heart of Gold"	BQL
58	241	13 August 2017	"Galway Girl"	Ed Sheeran	"Heart of Gold"	BQL
58	242	20 August 2017	"Galway Girl"	Ed Sheeran	"Heart of Gold"	BQL
58	243	27 August 2017	"Galway Girl"	Ed Sheeran	"Halo"	Alya
58	244	3 September 2017	"Galway Girl"	Ed Sheeran	"Heart of Gold"	BQL
58	245	10 September 2017	"Galway Girl"	Ed Sheeran	"Halo"	"Alya"
58	246	17 September 2017	"Galway Girl"	Ed Sheeran	"Halo"	"Alya"
58	247	24 September 2017	"Galway Girl"	Ed Sheeran	"Halo"	"Alya"
58	248	1 October 2017	"Galway Girl"	Ed Sheeran	"Halo"	"Alya"
59	249	8 October 2017	"Diamond Duck"	Maraaya	"Diamond Duck"	Maraaya
59	250	15 October 2017	"Diamond Duck"	Maraaya	"Diamond Duck"	Maraaya
re	251	22 October 2017	"Galway Girl"	Ed Sheeran	"Diamond Duck"	Maraaya
60	252	29 October 2017	"What About Us"	Pink	"Diamond Duck"	Maraaya
60	253	5 November 2017	"What About Us"	Pink	"Diamond Duck"	Maraaya
60	254	12 November 2017	"What About Us"	Pink	"Diamond Duck"	Maraaya
61	255	19 November 2017	"Perfect"	Ed Sheeran	"Diamond Duck"	Maraaya
61	256	26 November 2017	"Perfect"	Ed Sheeran	"Heart of Gold"	BQL
61	257	3 December 2017	"Perfect"	Ed Sheeran	"Ni predaje, ni umika"	BQL & Nika Zorjan
61	258	10 December 2017	"Perfect"	Ed Sheeran	"Ni predaje, ni umika"	BQL & Nika Zorjan
62	259	17 December 2017	"Havana"	Camila Cabello feat. Young Thug	"Ni predaje, ni umika"	BQL & Nika Zorjan
63	260	24 December 2017	"Last Christmas"	Wham!	"Ni predaje, ni umika"	BQL & Nika Zorjan
re	261	31 December 2017	"Havana"	Camila Cabello feat. Young Thug	"Ni predaje, ni umika"	BQL & Nika Zorjan

=== Number-one singles by month ===
Monthly charted #1 songs and highest charted counting among domestic songs only

No.	Month	Issue date	Number-one	Artist	Top domestic song	Top domestic artist
30	49	January 2017	"Human"	Rag'n'Bone Man	"Milijon in ena"	Klara Jazbec
31	50	February 2017	"Love My Life"	Robbie Williams	"Milijon in ena"	Klara Jazbec
32	51	March 2017	"Shape of You"	Ed Sheeran	"Heart of Gold"	BQL
32	52	April 2017	"Shape of You"	Ed Sheeran	"Heart of Gold"	BQL
32	53	May 2017	"Shape of You"	Ed Sheeran	"Heart of Gold"	BQL
32	54	June 2017	"Shape of You"	Ed Sheeran	"Halo"	Alya
33	55	July 2017	"Súbeme la Radio"	E. Iglesias ft. D. Bueno and Zion & Lennox	"Heart of Gold"	BQL
34	56	August 2017	"Galway Girl"	Ed Sheeran	"Heart of Gold"	BQL
34	57	September 2017	"Galway Girl"	Ed Sheeran	"Halo"	Alya
34	58	October 2017	"Galway Girl"	Ed Sheeran	"Diamond Duck"	Maraaya
35	59	November 2017	"What About Us"	Pink	"Diamond Duck"	Maraaya
36	60	December 2017	"Havana"	Camila Cabello feat. Young Thug	"Ni predaje, ni umika"	BQL & Nika Zorjan
