= Galway Girl (Ed Sheeran song) =

2017 single by Ed Sheeran

Single by Ed Sheeran

from the album ÷
- Released: 17 March 2017
- Recorded: 2015–2016
- Genre: Irish folk; pop rap; hip hop; R&B
- Length: 2:50
- Label: Asylum; Atlantic
- Songwriters: Amy Wadge; Damian McKee; Eamon Murray; Ed Sheeran; Foy Vance; Johnny McDaid; Liam Bradley; Niamh Dunne; Seán Óg Graham
- Producer: Mike Elizondo

Ed Sheeran singles chronology
"Shape of You" (2017)	"Galway Girl" (2017)	"Perfect" (2017)

Music video
- "Galway Girl" on YouTube

"Galway Girl" is a song by English singer-songwriter Ed Sheeran. The song is a collaboration between Sheeran and Irish folk band Beoga, and is heavily influenced by Irish traditional music. On Saint Patrick's Day, 17 March 2017, Sheeran announced the song as the third single from his 2017 album ÷, accompanied by a lyric video.

The song entered the charts of 31 countries around the world. It topped the charts in Ireland, Iceland, Slovenia, and Slovakia; reached number two in the UK, Australia, Belgium, Denmark, and Poland; and reached the top five on the charts of Germany, Hungary, Mexico, the Netherlands, Norway, and Sweden.

"Galway Girl" was included on the year-end top singles charts of 17 countries, including the top five of Belgium, Denmark, Slovenia, and the UK; the top 10 of Australia, Austria, Germany, New Zealand, and Sweden; and the top 20 of Hungary, Italy, Poland, and Switzerland.

The song was certified Platinum or multi-Platinum in 13 countries.

== Background ==
Sheeran wrote and recorded "Galway Girl" together with Irish band Beoga. The song incorporates parts of the tune "Minute 5" from their 2011 album How to Tune a Fish. They decided to write the song after they had finished another song together at his house, and had some free time.

In an interview with Zane Lowe of Beats 1, Sheeran said:

I came up with this song with Foy, and Johnny, and Amy. We were recording in Suffolk and we were just sitting in the garden, and we had Beoga, this Irish folk band, come and [record] some other songs. And I was kinda like: Beoga would be here for two or three days, it would be a shame to waste them, shall we try and write another song? [...] Beoga came out tried to do some bits in it, we just didn't really know where to go. But they have a song called "Minute 5", which is that riff. So I just said: "Can you try that on it?" And they did, and it sounded brilliant, so we just kept it.

In an interview with The Irish Times, Sheeran said that the opening line of the song, "She played the fiddle in an Irish band", was inspired by Niamh Dunne of Beoga. However, the rest of the song was made up and not about anyone in particular (Dunne is from County Limerick and married an Irishman and Sheeran, although English, is of paternal Irish descent).

Sheeran was aware that American singer-songwriter Steve Earle had recorded a song with the same title in 2000; however, in a BBC interview, Sheeran said that his version is an original, and not a cover of Earle's song. He also stated, "I actually tried to find another [title]. I did Wexford Girl, and Clonakilty Girl, and Cork Girl... None of them worked. But the whole point of folk songs is taking inspiration from the past and making something new – so people will just have to deal with it." In a 2017 Dublin concert Sheeran played first verse and chorus of Steve Earle's song together with Beoga, followed by his own.

Sheeran's record label did not believe in the commercial viability of the song, but Sheeran countered, "The Corrs sold 20 million records... Who's tried it since the Corrs? There's a huge gap in the market."

== Composition ==
"Galway Girl" is written in the key of F♯ minor in cut time with a tempo of 100 beats per minute. Sheeran's vocals span from E_{3} to F♯_{4}.

Sheeran was introduced to Beoga's music through Foy Vance; Sheeran, who had written several Irish-styled songs for the album, invited Beoga to collaborate with him to help ensure an authentic sound. Eamon Murray of Beoga described the collaboration as being very productive, noting Sheeran's ability to create a pop hook that "gets into people's heads", and recalling his own astonishment at how quickly the songs were written. Of the approximately half-dozen songs resulting from the session, two of them, "Galway Girl" and "Nancy Mulligan", were included on the album. Murray said that for "Galway Girl", the melody taken from Beoga's "Minute 5" was used to link the bridge and the chorus in the manner of a modern pop song, resulting in a pop song with an Irish flavor rather than a wholly traditional-sounding folk song.

== Release ==
The song was announced as the third single from the album ÷ on Saint Patrick's Day, 17 March 2017, and was added to BBC Radio 2's playlist on 18 March 2017.

According to Sheeran, he had to fight his record label to keep the song on his album: "They were really, really against 'Galway Girl', because apparently folk music isn't cool." However, he was able to convince them to include the song by telling them that it would be a "f***ing massive [hit] because there are 400 million people in the world who will say they are Irish even if they aren't".

The song went on to become the third most streamed song from ÷ on Spotify.

On 26 May, the radio single was published in Italy.

== Critical reception ==
Amy Mulvaney from the Irish Independent gave the song a positive review, calling it "definitive proof of just how much he (Ed) likes Ireland" and wrote "With mentions of Grafton Street, "Carrickfergus", fiddles, céilis, an Irish band and trad tunes, there's no denying just how much the pop star loves our fair isle, and can see this becoming a sure fire hit over the next few weeks." Jordan Bassett of NME described "Galway Girl" as a "stomping Irish hip hop jig that recounts dancing a merry [cèilidh] with the girl of your dreams while Van Morrison parps away in the background." Laura Snapes of Pitchfork referred to the song as a tribute to the Irish band the Corrs, noting the references to stereotypical Irish culture such as Guinness beer, Jameson Irish Whiskey, and Northern Irish songwriter Van Morrison. Snapes said, "Set to bodhrán and uileann pipes [sic], it's the latest of many Sheeran barnstormers about meeting a great gal (who is definitely real) on a boozy night out." Caitlin Gallagher of PopSugar referred to "Galway Girl" as the "new unofficial St. Patrick's Day theme song", and declared that the song is "catchy as hell (and will continue to be until the end of time)." Maura Johnston of Rolling Stone referred to the song as Sheeran's "own spin on the Irish drinking song", and that his "musical history lesson is both well-timed and rip-roaringly fun, another example of his still-evolving craft." Writing for The New York Times, Jon Caramanica described the song as a "literal take on Irish-inflected pop", also drawing a comparison to music of Irish band the Corrs. He felt it incorporated traditional Irish instrumentation in a "blandly effective" manner, rather than being a more thorough exploration of traditional Irish sound and music. Craig Jenkins of Vulture found it to be an "upbeat R&B love song with Celtic folk accents", with a "guitar breakdown that sounds like a nod to Oasis' 'Wonderwall'."

Galway Girl was ranked as one of the worst songs of 2017 by Time and New York Post, with the latter calling it a "hodgepodge of borderline-offensive Irish clichés".

== Chart performance ==
The song entered the UK chart at number two behind "Shape of You" when it became available for download on the album release. As of September 2017, the song has sold 1.2 million combined units in the United Kingdom, with 246,000 in actual sales and 0.95 million in streams.

In Ireland, it debuted at number one on the singles chart. It also reached the number one chart position in Scotland and Slovenia. In the United States, the song peaked at number 53, and has sold 210,813 copies as of October 2017.

== Music video ==
On 11 April 2017, Sheeran shot the POV music video for "Galway Girl" in Galway, Ireland, and filmed it himself on a Sony α7S on body-mounted Ikan EC-1 gimbal rigged to a Steadicam vest. The video was directed by Jason Koenig, who also directed the music video for "Shape of You", and director of photography Johnny Valencia. It was uploaded to Sheeran's official YouTube channel on 3 May 2017.

The video begins with Sheeran leaving a concert (at the 3 Arena in Dublin) he has just finished playing. He goes to a bar where he finds Saoirse Ronan, who is dancing on a table and drinking Guinness beer. The two drink beer, dance together, and play darts. Sheeran enrages another man at the bar by accidentally hitting him in the back with a dart, and Sheeran and Ronan quickly leave. Out in the street, they encounter Irish dancers, stop to listen to a busker, and ride bikes to a tattoo parlor where Sheeran gets a tattoo. They return to the bar for more dancing and drinking. Sheeran spills beer on the same man he hit with a dart earlier, and gets knocked out, but wakes up at Ronan's apartment. The video concludes with both Sheeran and Ronan on the apartment's rooftop balcony together, looking out over The Long Walk and Galway Bay.

The video for "Galway Girl" features Irish actress Saoirse Ronan. Sheeran was impressed by Ronan's performance in the video, commenting, "She, off-screen, is normal and just like a cool person and as soon as the camera goes on her she just turns... It was a really phenomenal thing to watch. I've never really seen a young actor or actress that good. She's really talented." The video also features cameos by several local celebrities, including Irish comedian and presenter Tommy Tiernan, host of The Tommy Tiernan Show.

Sheeran's new tattoo filmed in the video is misspelled "Galway Grill", which Sheeran said was the result of a prank by Ronan. Sheeran later clarified that the misspell was planned.

== Live performances ==
On 6 July 2017, Sheeran performed the song along with other songs from ÷, live at Rockefeller Center in New York City for the Today show. About 12,000 fans attended the performance, with some lining up before sunrise to secure their place in line.

On 8 December 2017, Sheeran performed "Galway Girl" live at the Z100 Jingle Ball at Madison Square Garden in New York City.

On 10 December 2017, Sheeran performed the song live at the Jingle Bell Ball at London's O2 arena, hosted by Capital FM.

Sheeran, accompanied by Beoga, performed "Galway Girl" at the 2018 Billboard Music Awards on 20 May 2018. Although he was on world tour in support of his album ÷ at the time, his performance at Phoenix Park in Dublin was broadcast at the award ceremony in Las Vegas.

== Track listing ==
- Digital download
1. "Galway Girl" – 2:50
- Digital download – Martin Jensen remix
1. "Galway Girl" (Martin Jensen remix) – 3:16

== Charts ==
=== Weekly charts ===
Chart (2017)	Peak position
Argentina Anglo (Monitor Latino)	16
Australia (ARIA)	2
Austria (Ö3 Austria Top 40)	6
Belgium (Ultratop 50 Flanders)	2
Belgium (Ultratop 50 Wallonia)	4
Canada Hot 100 (Billboard)	16
Canada AC (Billboard)	30
Canada CHR/Top 40 (Billboard)	12
Canada Hot AC (Billboard)	15
CIS Airplay (TopHit)	94
Czech Republic Airplay (ČNS IFPI)	3
Czech Republic Singles Digital (ČNS IFPI)	4
Denmark (Tracklisten)	2
Denmark Airplay (Tracklisten)	12
Euro Digital Songs (Billboard)	3
Finland (Suomen virallinen lista)	9
France (SNEP)	15
Germany (GfK)	5
Hungary (Dance Top 40)	11
Hungary (Rádiós Top 40)	5
Hungary (Single Top 40)	10
Hungary (Stream Top 40)	3
Iceland (RÚV)	1
Ireland (IRMA)	1
Italy (FIMI)	14
Japan Hot 100 (Billboard)	67
Malaysia (RIM)	15
Mexico (Billboard Ingles Airplay)	5
Netherlands (Dutch Top 40)	7
Netherlands (Mega Top 50)	4
Netherlands (Single Top 100)	6
New Zealand (Recorded Music NZ)	3
Norway (VG-lista)	4
Philippines (Philippine Hot 100)	23
Poland Airplay (ZPAV)	2
Portugal (AFP)	11
Russia Airplay (TopHit)	87
Scottish Singles Sales (Official Charts)	1
Slovakia Airplay (ČNS IFPI)	1
Slovakia Singles Digital (ČNS IFPI)	6
Slovenia (SloTop50)	1
Spain (PROMUSICAE)	37
Sweden (Sverigetopplistan)	3
Switzerland (Schweizer Hitparade)	7
UK Singles (Official Charts)	2
US Billboard Hot 100	53

=== Monthly charts ===
Chart (2017)	Peak position
Slovenia (SloTop50)	1

=== Year-end charts ===
Chart (2017)	Position
Australia (ARIA)	7
Austria (Ö3 Austria Top 40)	9
Belgium (Ultratop Flanders)	4
Belgium (Ultratop Wallonia)	11
Brazil (Pro-Música Brasil)	107
Canada (Canadian Hot 100)	30
Denmark (Tracklisten)	3
France (SNEP)	59
Germany (Official German Charts)	10
Hungary (Dance Top 40)	53
Hungary (Rádiós Top 40)	22
Hungary (Single Top 40)	32
Hungary (Stream Top 40)	20
Iceland (Tónlistinn)	30
Israel (Media Forest)	34
Italy (FIMI)	14
Latvia Airplay (LaIPA)	56
Netherlands (Dutch Top 40)	42
Netherlands (Single Top 100)	26
New Zealand (Recorded Music NZ)	9
Poland Airplay (ZPAV)	16
Portugal (AFP)	54
Slovenia Airplay (SloTop50)	3
Spain (PROMUSICAE)	93
Sweden (Sverigetopplistan)	9
Switzerland (Schweizer Hitparade)	12
UK Singles (Official Charts Company)	5

Chart (2018)	Position
Hungary (Dance Top 40)	86

=== Decade-end charts ===
Chart (2010–2019)	Position
UK Singles (Official Charts Company)	53

== Certifications ==
Certifications for "Galway Girl"
Region	Certification	Certified units/sales
Australia (ARIA)	8× Platinum	560,000^{‡}
Austria (IFPI Austria)	3× Platinum	90,000^{‡}
Belgium (BRMA)	2× Platinum	40,000^{‡}
Canada (Music Canada)	8× Platinum	640,000^{‡}
Denmark (IFPI Danmark)	4× Platinum	360,000^{‡}
France (SNEP)	Platinum	133,333^{‡}
Germany (BVMI)	Diamond	1,500,000^{‡}
Italy (FIMI)	4× Platinum	200,000^{‡}
New Zealand (RMNZ)	6× Platinum	180,000^{‡}
Poland (ZPAV)	Diamond	250,000^{‡}
Portugal (AFP)	2× Platinum	20,000^{‡}
Spain (Promusicae)	2× Platinum	120,000^{‡}
Sweden (GLF)	3× Platinum	120,000^{‡}
Switzerland (IFPI Switzerland)	2× Platinum	40,000^{‡}
United Kingdom (BPI)	5× Platinum	3,000,000^{‡}
United States (RIAA)	2× Platinum	2,000,000^{‡}
Streaming
Japan (RIAJ)	Platinum	100,000,000^{†}
^{‡} Sales+streaming figures based on certification alone.^{†} Streaming-only figures based on certification alone.

== Release history ==
Country	Date	Format	Version	Label	Ref.
United Kingdom	17 March 2017	Contemporary hit radio	Original	Asylum	
United Kingdom	7 April 2017	Digital download	Martin Jensen remix	Atlantic	
United States	7 April 2017	Digital download	Martin Jensen remix	Atlantic	

== Covers and adaptations ==
- In April 2017, Ritchie Remo, a Northern Ireland singer released his single "Galway Girls" being a mashup of this Ed Sheeran song and the similarly titled Steve Earle song "Galway Girl".
- Multiple YouTube artists have released covers of the song, including Malinda Kathleen Reese, Jason Chen, Joseph Vincent, Michael Lynch, and Madilyn Bailey.
- Damian McGinty, a member of the Irish stage production Celtic Thunder, covered the song for their most recent CD/DVD set Celtic Thunder X.

== See also ==
- List of number-one singles of 2017 (Ireland)
- List of Scottish number-one singles of 2017
- List of number-one singles of 2017 (Slovenia)
