= List of number-one singles of 2017 (Ireland) =

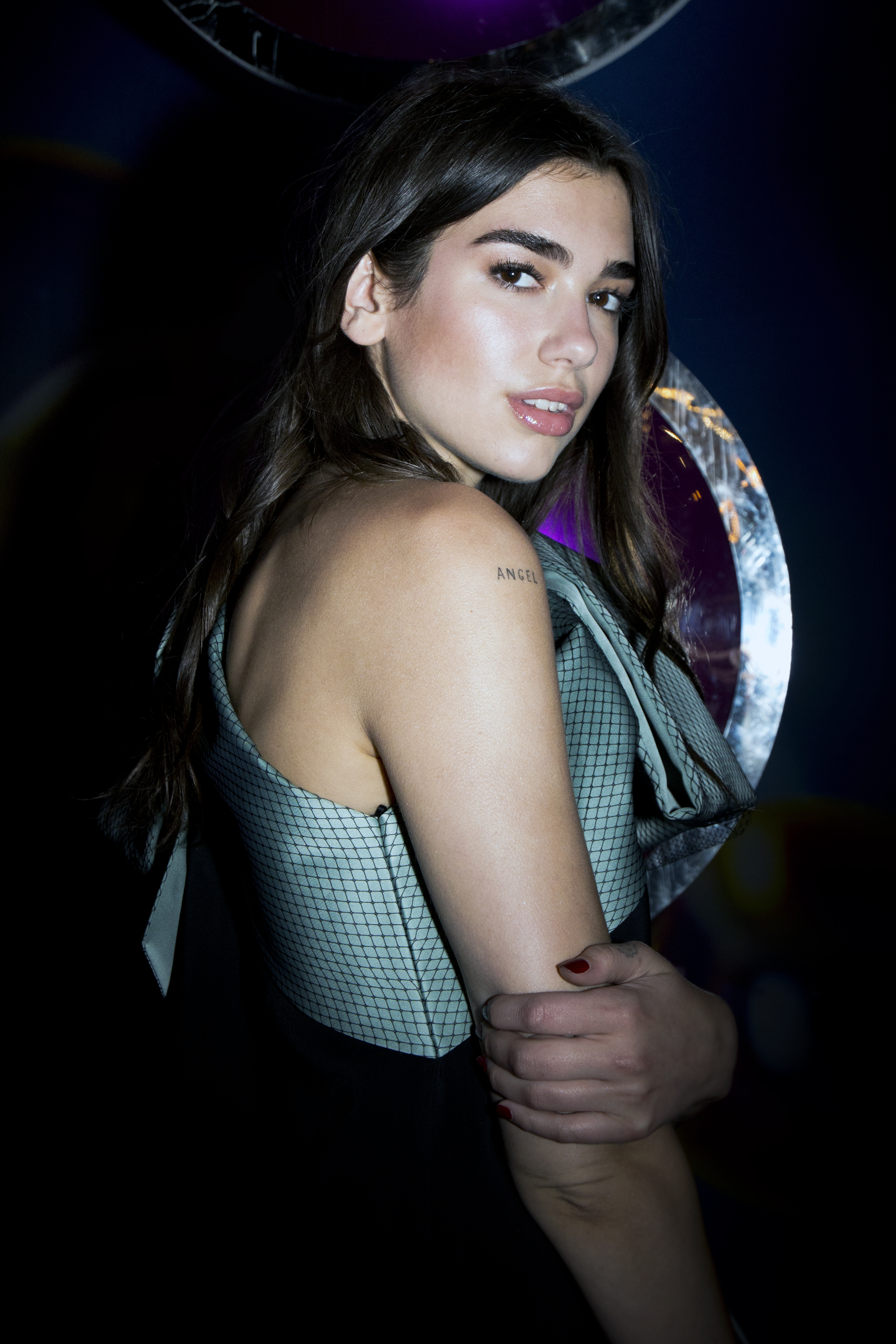
Dua Lipa spent eight weeks at number one with "New Rules".

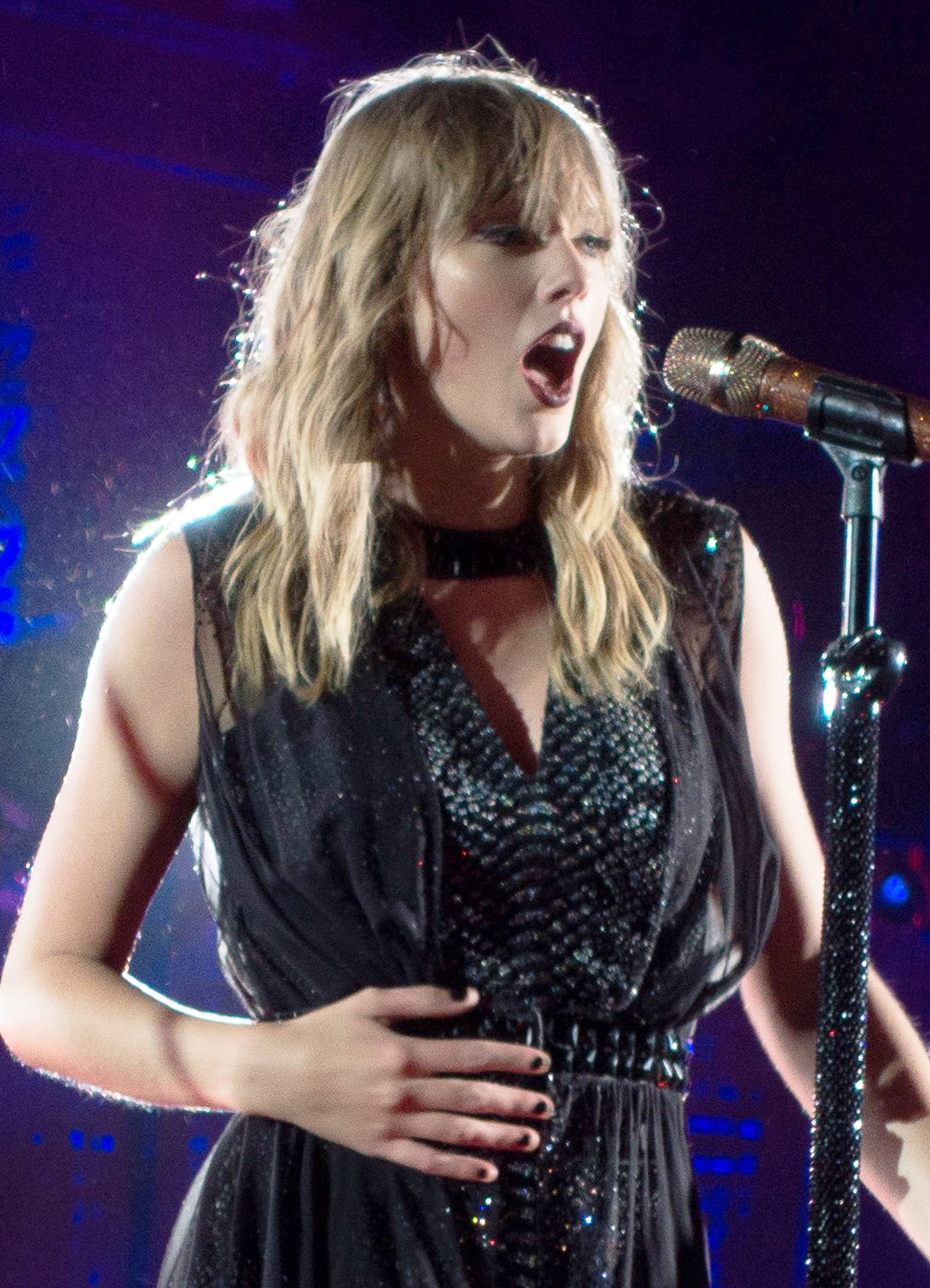
Taylor Swift gained her first number one with "Look What You Made Me Do".

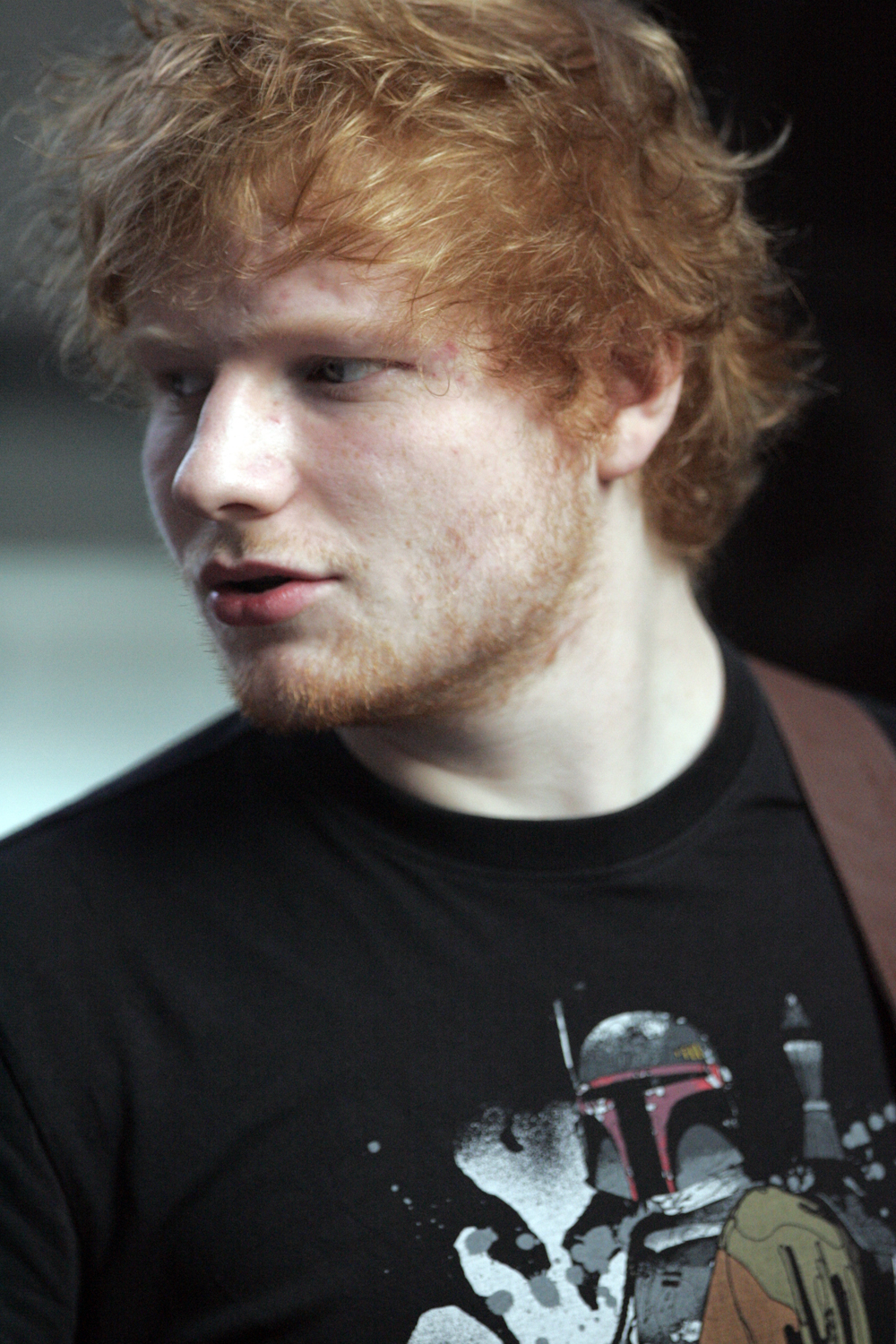
Ed Sheeran had three number ones in 2017 with "Shape of You", "Galway Girl" and "Perfect", he also spent a total of 20 weeks at number one.

The Irish Singles Chart ranks the best-performing singles in Ireland, as compiled by the Official Charts Company on behalf of the Irish Recorded Music Association.

Issue date	Song	Artist(s)	Reference
6 January	"Rockabye"	Clean Bandit featuring Sean Paul and Anne-Marie	
13 January	"Shape of You"	Ed Sheeran	
20 January	"Shape of You"	Ed Sheeran	
27 January	"Shape of You"	Ed Sheeran	
3 February	"Shape of You"	Ed Sheeran	
10 February	"Shape of You"	Ed Sheeran	
17 February	"Shape of You"	Ed Sheeran	
24 February	"Shape of You"	Ed Sheeran	
3 March	"Shape of You"	Ed Sheeran	
10 March	"Galway Girl"	Ed Sheeran	
17 March	"Galway Girl"	Ed Sheeran	
24 March	"Shape of You"	Ed Sheeran	
31 March	"Shape of You"	Ed Sheeran	
7 April	"Shape of You"	Ed Sheeran	
14 April	"Shape of You"	Ed Sheeran	
21 April	"Shape of You"	Ed Sheeran	
28 April	"Shape of You"	Ed Sheeran	
5 May	"Despacito"	Luis Fonsi and Daddy Yankee featuring Justin Bieber	
12 May	"Despacito"	Luis Fonsi and Daddy Yankee featuring Justin Bieber	
19 May	"Despacito"	Luis Fonsi and Daddy Yankee featuring Justin Bieber	
26 May	"Despacito"	Luis Fonsi and Daddy Yankee featuring Justin Bieber	
2 June	"Despacito"	Luis Fonsi and Daddy Yankee featuring Justin Bieber	
9 June	"Despacito"	Luis Fonsi and Daddy Yankee featuring Justin Bieber	
16 June	"Despacito"	Luis Fonsi and Daddy Yankee featuring Justin Bieber	
23 June	"Despacito"	Luis Fonsi and Daddy Yankee featuring Justin Bieber	
30 June	"Despacito"	Luis Fonsi and Daddy Yankee featuring Justin Bieber	
7 July	"Despacito"	Luis Fonsi and Daddy Yankee featuring Justin Bieber	
14 July	"Despacito"	Luis Fonsi and Daddy Yankee featuring Justin Bieber	
21 July	"Despacito"	Luis Fonsi and Daddy Yankee featuring Justin Bieber	
28 July	"Despacito"	Luis Fonsi and Daddy Yankee featuring Justin Bieber	
4 August	"Despacito"	Luis Fonsi and Daddy Yankee featuring Justin Bieber	
11 August	"Despacito"	Luis Fonsi and Daddy Yankee featuring Justin Bieber	
18 August	"New Rules"	Dua Lipa	
25 August	"New Rules"	Dua Lipa	
1 September	"Look What You Made Me Do"	Taylor Swift	
8 September	"New Rules"	Dua Lipa	
15 September	"New Rules"	Dua Lipa	
22 September	"New Rules"	Dua Lipa	
29 September	"New Rules"	Dua Lipa	
6 October	"New Rules"	Dua Lipa	
13 October	"New Rules"	Dua Lipa	
20 October	"Rockstar"	Post Malone featuring 21 Savage	
27 October	"Rockstar"	Post Malone featuring 21 Savage	
3 November	"Havana"	Camila Cabello featuring Young Thug	
10 November	"Havana"	Camila Cabello featuring Young Thug	
17 November	"Havana"	Camila Cabello featuring Young Thug	
24 November	"Havana"	Camila Cabello featuring Young Thug	
1 December	"Havana"	Camila Cabello featuring Young Thug	
8 December	"Perfect"	Ed Sheeran	
15 December	"Perfect"	Ed Sheeran	
22 December	"Perfect"	Ed Sheeran	
29 December	"Perfect"	Ed Sheeran	

== Number-one artists ==
Position	Artist	Weeks at No. 1
1	Ed Sheeran	20
2	Luis Fonsi	15
2	Daddy Yankee	15
2	Justin Bieber	15
5	Dua Lipa	8
6	Camila Cabello	5
6	Young Thug	5
8	Post Malone	2
8	21 Savage	2
10	Clean Bandit	1
10	Sean Paul	1
10	Anne-Marie	1
10	Taylor Swift	1
