= Havana (Camila Cabello song) =

2017 single by Camila Cabello featuring Young Thug

Single by Camila Cabello featuring Young Thug

from the album Camila
- Released: August 3, 2017
- Studio: NightBird (West Hollywood); Westlake (West Hollywood); TwentyNine Lions (Studio City)
- Genre: Pop; Latin
- Length: 3:37 (album version); 2:53 (no rap/radio edit)
- Label: Epic; Syco
- Songwriters: Camila Cabello; Jeffery Williams; Brittany Hazzard; Pharrell Williams; Adam Feeney; Brian Lee; Ali Tamposi; Andrew Watt; Louis Bell; Kaan Gunesberk
- Producer: Frank Dukes

Camila Cabello singles chronology
"Know No Better" (2017)	"Havana" (2017)	"Never Be the Same" (2017)

Young Thug singles chronology
"Trap Trap Trap" (2017)	"Havana" (2017)	"Homie" (2017)

Music video
- "Havana" on YouTube

Audio sample
- file; help

"Havana" is a song by American singer Camila Cabello featuring American rapper Young Thug, from her debut studio album Camila (2018). It was released on August 3, 2017, alongside "OMG" initially as a promotional single; it was later serviced to radio on September 8, 2017, as a single. Due to its rising success, "Havana" later became the official lead single of Camila, replacing "Crying in the Club".

In November 2017, a remix version of the song with Puerto Rican rapper Daddy Yankee was released. The first verse and pre-chorus of the remix is sung in Spanish while Daddy Yankee replaces Young Thug's verse.

"Havana" received critical acclaim with music critics calling the song "sultry" and "bouncy." "Havana" peaked at the top of the Billboard Hot 100, becoming the first number one song for both Cabello and Thug. Outside of the United States, "Havana" topped the charts in 23 countries worldwide, including Australia, Canada, Chile, France, and the United Kingdom. It is certified Diamond in eight countries. Its music video, directed by Dave Meyers, shows Cabello playing herself as Karla, as well as a telenovela actress and a film protagonist. It won the Video of the Year award at the 2018 MTV Video Music Awards, receiving three other nominations. A vertical video, directed by Sam Lecca, was released on November 10, 2017, on Cabello's official Vevo account. The clip shows the singer and several dancers in the New York City Subway. The clip was previously a Spotify exclusive.

Cabello performed "Havana" at several award shows, including the 2017 MTV Europe Music Awards, the 2018 iHeartRadio Music Awards, and the 2018 Billboard Music Awards. In September 2018, Cabello released a live version of the song featuring her solo performance. The live version of the song would later be nominated for a Grammy Award for Best Pop Solo Performance at the 61st Annual Grammy Awards. It was the best-selling digital single of 2018 according to the International Federation of the Phonographic Industry (IFPI), with equivalent sales of 19 million units worldwide.

"Havana" was certified Diamond by the Recording Industry Association of America in October 2021 for selling 10,000,000 units, making Cabello the first Hispanic singer to achieve this milestone.

== Composition ==
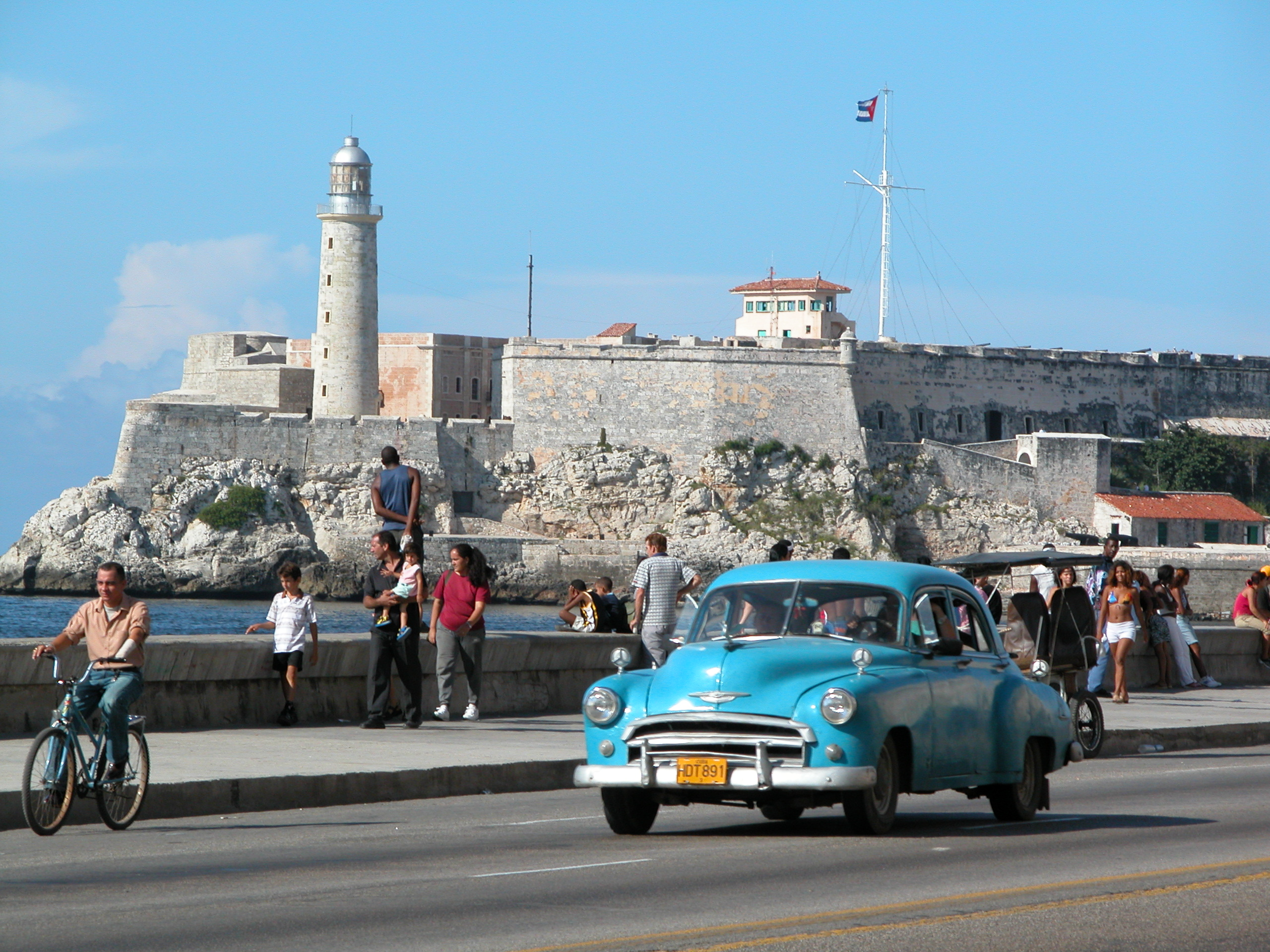
View of Havana, Cabello's inspiration for the song.

"Havana" is a salsa-inspired mid-tempo pop and Latin song with R&B-pop beats and trap influences, on which Cabello embraces her Cuban heritage. Cabello sings the chorus over Latin-influenced piano riffs and rhythm, with the melody's chord progression constantly switching between Gm–E♭–D_{7} and Gm–E♭maj_{7}–D_{7}. It is performed in the key of G minor, with Cabello's vocals ranging from G_{3} to D_{5}. It has the same slinky, snap-accented intro as "Same Old Love" by Selena Gomez, released two years before. Sadie Bell of Billboard interpreted the line "Half of my heart is in Havana" as the song chronicling "a romance that found Cabello's heart left down south", while for Rolling Stone's Brittany Spanos said that in the "clubby, smooth" track, Cabello falls in love with "a mysterious suitor from East Atlanta", though she has left her heart in her hometown. Young Thug performs a sing-song verse over the "bouncy" piano. Rap-Up described the song as a "Latin fusion", and XXL called it a "straightforward pop track". The second verse featuring Young Thug is replaced with the original lyrics sung by Cabello.

== Critical reception ==
"Havana" received universal acclaim. Jamieson Cox of Pitchfork regarded the "sultry, salsa-inflected" song as a "keystone for a superstar origin story." Writing for Billboard, Sadie Bell said that the "sexy" track radiates a "Latin flare". Similarly, Much's Allison Bowsher opined the track "arrives just in time to keep the summer heat going on the radio." Raise Bruner of Time wrote that "Havana" "hits a freshly sultry note that we hope to see more of in her debut album." Peter Berry of XXL felt that Young Thug's verse "blends with the bouncy piano perfectly." Billboard considered it the 19th best song released in 2017, with Lyndsey Havens writing that the song "didn't arrive like a breakthrough hit, but it ended up changing the entire course" of Cabello's solo career, as she "sheds the weight that came with trying to prove herself outside of her former girl group and clears a path to finally be herself." Popjustice ranked it 19th, while The Fader ranked it 48th. Stephen Kearse of Complex, which ranked the song 28th, wrote: "Warm, bouncy, nostalgic, and sweaty, 'Havana' builds a one-night stand into a pulsating fever dream that blurs reality and fantasy", praising Cabello's "layered vocals" and Young Thug's presence.

=== Accolades ===
Year-end lists
Publication	List	Rank	Ref.
Billboard	The 100 Best Songs of 2017	19	
Complex	The 50 Best Songs of 2017	28	
The Fader	The 101 Best Songs of 2017	48	
The Philadelphia Inquirer	The Best Songs of 2017	placed	
Popjustice	The Top 45 Singles of 2017	19	
Stereogum	The Top 40 Pop Songs of 2017	32	
Stereogum	The 50 Best Music Videos of 2017	18	

Decade-end lists
Publication	List	Rank	Ref.
Billboard	The 100 Songs That Defined the Decade	placed	
Elle	The 52 Best Songs That Defined The 2010s	placed	
Paste	The 100 Best Songs of 2010s	60	

== Chart performance ==
In the United Kingdom, "Havana" entered the UK Singles Chart at number 53 on the chart dated August 11, 2017. It rose to number two in its ninth week, behind only Post Malone's "Rockstar" featuring 21 Savage. On November 3, it reached number one, giving Cabello and Young Thug their first UK number-one single. It then held the top position for five weeks before falling behind Ed Sheeran's "Perfect".

In October 2017, the single reached number seven on the US Billboard Hot 100 in its twelfth week, becoming Cabello's second top 10 entry as a solo artist and Young Thug's first. In January 2018, "Havana" reached number one on the Hot 100 for one week after spending seven non-consecutive weeks occupying the number two spot behind both Post Malone and 21 Savage's "Rockstar" for five weeks and Ed Sheeran and Beyoncé's "Perfect Duet" for an additional two weeks, becoming both Cabello and Young Thug's first song to top the chart. The song took 23 weeks to reach the top spot, equaling the longest climb for a female artist with Sia's "Cheap Thrills" (2016) and Patti Austin's "Baby, Come to Me" (1982–1983). Cabello became the third artist in chart history to top both the Hot 100 and Billboard 200 for their first time in the same week, after Britney Spears and Beyoncé did so in 1999 and 2003, respectively. The song has also been certified Diamond by the Recording Industry Association of America (RIAA). "Havana" became the ninth song to top the Mainstream Top 40, Rhythmic and Adult Top 40 airplay charts–over the 22 years that all three charts have coexisted.

"Havana" reached number one on the Australian ARIA Singles Chart in its twelfth week on the chart, becoming Cabello's first number-one song, including during her time as part of Fifth Harmony. It held the summit for three weeks before also being displaced by "Perfect".

The song became Spotify's most-streamed song ever by a solo female artist in June 2018, with more than one billion streams at the time.

== Music video ==
Cabello shared a 26-second preview of the short film for "Havana" on October 22, 2017, through her YouTube channel. The video filmed in Los Angeles, California. The video featured appearances by Lele Pons as Bella, LeJuan James as Abuelita, Noah Centineo as Cabello's love interest, Marco DelVecchio as the twins Juan and Rodrigo and Mikey Pesante as the dancer. It was directed by Dave Meyers and was released on October 24, 2017. Young Thug also appears in the video.

The film scene gave the video a "classic" 1960s appeal, as described by a Fuse writer.

The main song starts late but the music video starts with Karla, played by Cabello, watching a telenovela, before being interrupted by her grandmother, who turns off the TV and advises her to live her life instead of spending her days indoors. Karla then leaves the house to go see a movie. The film she is watching, called Camila in Havana, takes the form of a music video, starring a version of herself wearing a fringe-covered red dress and performing at a club. Aside from appearing as Karla, Cabello also plays the telenovela actress and the movie protagonist. After the film ends, she leaves the cinema and stumbles across a cyclist, also the male protagonist of the film, and begins dancing with him.

Tom Breihan of Stereogum, which ranked the song 28th of 50 best music videos of 2017, reviewed on December 18, 2017: "Camila Cabello is going to be a movie star one day, and she might still never deliver a better performance than the one she gives in this multiple-role video."

It received four nominations at the 2018 MTV Video Music Awards, for Video of the Year, Song of the Year, Best Pop Video, and Best Choreography, winning the first. As of January 2025, the video has received more than 1.11 billion views on YouTube, while the audio track has over 2 billion views, a total of over 3.11 billion.

== Live performances and remixes ==
Cabello performed the song for the first time on television on The Tonight Show Starring Jimmy Fallon on September 25, 2017. The same week she performed on The Today Show, where she delivered a message to "all the dreamers" in support of the Deferred Action for Childhood Arrivals. On October 27, Cabello performed a Spanglish version of the song at the Latin American Music Awards. She also performed the song at the BBC Radio 1's Teen Awards, LOS40 Music Awards iHeartRadio Fiesta Latina, and the MTV Europe Music Awards. Her performance at the MTV EMAs was ranked as the best of the night by Billboard writer Joe Lynch. Her performance at Billboard Women in Music was the stripped-down version of the song, backed only by a guitar, keyboard and light drumming. It was also performed at Dick Clark's New Year's Rockin' Eve in 2017, and later she gave a cabaret-style performance on The Ellen DeGeneres Show during the album release week. She gave a performance inspired by Marilyn Monroe's Gentlemen Prefer Blondes role and Madonna's "Material Girl" music video at the 2018 iHeartRadio Music Awards with Young Thug. Cabello performed the song with Ricky Martin, J Balvin, Young Thug and Arturo Sandoval as the opening act at the 61st Annual Grammy Awards in February 2019. On May 28, 2022, Cabello performed the song in the 2022 UEFA Champions League Final.

Several remixes of the song have been made. On November 11, 2017, a remix made by Puerto Rican rapper Daddy Yankee was published on Cabello's official YouTube channel. The first verse of the remix is sung in Spanish while Daddy Yankee replaces Young Thug's verse. The video has 142 million views as of January 18, 2023. Additionally, a popular remix made by YouTuber Maestro Ziikos was uploaded to YouTube on November 24 which was a remix that featured then U.S. President Donald Trump "singing" (the remix was made via taking excerpts from various Trump speeches and adjusting their tone to the song). Though the song was generally praised for the effort that went into it, Cabello herself, as a critic of Trump due to his plans to rescind DACA, was displeased with the remix, and after fans repeatedly asked her about it, she took to Twitter to apologize to the city of Havana for the remix. The Trump remix has 132 million views as of January 18, 2023.

== Awards and nominations ==
Year	Organization	Award	Result	Ref.
2018	American Music Awards	Collaboration of the Year	Won	
2018	American Music Awards	Video of the Year	Won	
2018	American Music Awards	Favorite Pop/Rock Song	Won	
2018	MTV Europe Music Awards	Best Song	Won	
2018	MTV Europe Music Awards	Best Video	Won	
2018	MTV Video Music Awards	Video of the Year	Won	
2018	MTV Video Music Awards	Song of the Year	Nominated	
2018	MTV Video Music Awards	Best Pop Video	Nominated	
2018	MTV Video Music Awards	Best Choreography	Nominated	
2018	Radio Disney Music Awards	Song of the Year	Won	
2018	Teen Choice Awards	Choice Song: Female Artist	Won	
2019	ASCAP Latin Awards	Award-winning songs "Havana (Remix)"	Won	
2019	Grammy Awards	Best Pop Solo Performance "Havana (Live)"	Nominated	

== Track listing ==
- Digital download
1. "Havana" (featuring Young Thug) – 3:36
- Digital download – Daddy Yankee remix
1. "Havana" (Remix) with Daddy Yankee – 3:19
- Digital download – original version
1. "Havana" (No Rap Version) – 2:54
- Digital download – live version
1. "Havana" (Live) – 4:08
- CD single
1. "Havana" (featuring Young Thug) – 3:36
2. "Havana" (Remix) with Daddy Yankee – 3:19

== Credits and personnel ==
Credits from the liner notes of Camila and adapted from Jaxsta.

=== Studio recording ===
- Camila Cabello's vocals recorded at NightBird Recording Studios (West Hollywood, California)
- Young Thug's vocals recorded at Westlake Recording Studios (West Hollywood, California)
- Camila Cabello's vocals produced at TwentyNine Lions (Studio City, California)
- Mixed at Larrabee Sound Studios (North Hollywood, California)
- Mastered at The Mastering Place (New York City)

=== Personnel ===
Performance
- Camila Cabello – lead vocals
- Young Thug – guest vocals
- Pharrell Williams – background vocals
- Starrah – background vocals
- Frank Dukes – piano, bass, programming
- Kaan Gunesberk – keyboards
- Serafin Aguilar – trumpet
- Tom Moffett – trumpet
- Leland Whitty – saxophone
Production and songwriting
- Frank Dukes – production, songwriting
- Matt Beckley – vocal production, songwriting
- Camila Cabello – songwriting
- Kaan Gunesberk – songwriting
- Brian Lee – songwriting
- Starrah – songwriting
- Ali Tamposi – songwriting
- Andrew Watt – songwriting
- Pharrell Williams – songwriting
- Young Thug – songwriting
Technical
- Martin Gray – recording
- Mike Gaydusek – recording
- Robbie Soukiasyan – recording
- Kyle Mann – recording
- Marco Falcone – assistant recording
- Sean Madden – assistant recording
- Henry Guevara – assistant recording
- Jaycen Joshua – mixing
- David Nakaji – assistant mixing
- Ivan Jimenez – assistant mixing
- Kevin Peterson – mastering

=== Live version ===
Credits adapted from Tidal.

- Camila Cabello – vocals
- Ryan Cecil – recording
- Emerson Mancini – mastering
- Serban Ghenea – mixing

== Charts ==
=== Weekly charts ===
2017–2020 Weekly chart performance for "Havana"
Chart (2017–2020)	Peak position
Argentina (Monitor Latino)	1
Australia (ARIA)	1
Austria (Ö3 Austria Top 40)	2
Belgium (Ultratop 50 Flanders)	2
Belarus Airplay (Eurofest)	14
Belgium R&B/Hip-Hop (Ultratop Flanders)	1
Belgium (Ultratop 50 Wallonia)	2
Bolivia (Monitor Latino)	5
Brazil Airplay (Billboard Brasil)	1
Bulgaria Airplay (PROPHON)	1
Canada Hot 100 (Billboard)	1
Canada AC (Billboard)	8
Canada CHR/Top 40 (Billboard)	1
Canada Hot AC (Billboard)	2
Chile (Monitor Latino)	1
Colombia (Monitor Latino)	9
Colombia (National-Report)	8
Costa Rica (Monitor Latino)	3
Croatia International Airplay (Top lista)	2
CIS Airplay (TopHit)	12
Czech Republic Airplay (ČNS IFPI)	4
Czech Republic Singles Digital (ČNS IFPI)	1
Denmark (Tracklisten)	2
Dominican Republic (Monitor Latino)	19
Dominican Republic (SODINPRO)	43
Ecuador (National-Report)	7
El Salvador (Monitor Latino)	2
Euro Digital Songs (Billboard)	1
Finland (Suomen virallinen lista)	9
France (SNEP)	1
Germany (GfK)	2
Greece Digital Songs (Billboard)	1
Guatemala (Monitor Latino)	5
Honduras (Monitor Latino)	5
Hong Kong (HKRIA)	16
Hungary (Rádiós Top 40)	1
Hungary (Dance Top 40)	1
Hungary (Single Top 40)	1
Hungary (Stream Top 40)	1
Iceland (Tónlistinn)	2
Ireland (IRMA)	1
Israel International Airplay (Media Forest)	1
Italy (FIMI)	2
Japan (Japan Hot 100)	10
Latvia (DigiTop100)	4
Lebanon Airlay (Lebanese Top 20)	4
Luxembourg Digital Songs (Billboard)	2
Malaysia (RIM)	2
Mexico (Monitor Latino)	1
Mexico Airplay (Billboard)	1
Netherlands (Dutch Top 40)	2
Netherlands (Single Top 100)	5
New Zealand (Recorded Music NZ)	2
Nicaragua (Monitor Latino)	9
Norway (VG-lista)	16
Panama (Monitor Latino)	3
Paraguay (Monitor Latino)	1
Peru (Monitor Latino)	10
Philippines (BillboardBH Hot 100)	1
Poland Airplay (ZPAV)	1
Portugal (AFP)	1
Romania (Airplay 100)	1
Russia Airplay (TopHit)	31
Scottish Singles Sales (Official Charts)	1
Serbia Airplay (Radiomonitor)	1
Singapore (RIAS)	2
Slovakia Airplay (ČNS IFPI)	1
Slovakia Singles Digital (ČNS IFPI)	1
Slovenia (SloTop50)	1
South Korea (Gaon)	6
Spain (Promusicae)	4
Sweden (Sverigetopplistan)	4
Switzerland (Schweizer Hitparade)	2
UK Singles (Official Charts)	1
Ukraine Airplay (TopHit)	7
Uruguay (Monitor Latino)	1
US Billboard Hot 100	1
US Adult Contemporary (Billboard)	5
US Adult Pop Airplay (Billboard)	1
US Dance Club Songs (Billboard)	12
US Dance Airplay (Billboard)	1
US Latin Airplay (Billboard)	11
US Pop Airplay (Billboard)	1
US Radio Songs (Billboard)	1
US Rhythmic Airplay (Billboard)	1
Venezuela (National-Report)	6
Venezuela (Record Report)	54

2024 Weekly chart performance for "Havana"
Chart (2024)	Peak position
Moldova Airplay (TopHit)	36

Weekly chart performance for Daddy Yankee remix
Chart (2017)	Peak position
Latvia (DigiTop100)	65
Spain (Promusicae)	16
US Latin Airplay (Billboard)	11

=== Monthly charts ===
Monthly chart performance for "Havana"
Chart (2017)	Peak position
Brazil Streaming (Pro-Música)	2

=== Year-end charts ===
2017 year-end chart performance for "Havana"
Chart (2017)	Position
Australia (ARIA)	19
Austria (Ö3 Austria Top 40)	23
Belgium (Ultratop Flanders)	69
Belgium R&B/Hip-Hop (Ultratop Flanders)	19
Belgium (Ultratop Wallonia)	82
Brazil (Pro-Música Brasil)	52
Canada (Canadian Hot 100)	56
Denmark (Tracklisten)	44
France (SNEP)	42
Germany (Official German Charts)	18
Hungary (Dance Top 40)	63
Hungary (Single Top 40)	10
Hungary (Stream Top 40)	16
Israel (Media Forest)	25
Italy (FIMI)	60
Portugal (AFP)	18
South Korea International (Gaon)	36
Netherlands (Dutch Top 40)	34
Netherlands (Single Top 100)	48
New Zealand (Recorded Music NZ)	24
Poland (ZPAV)	58
Spain (PROMUSICAE)	65
Sweden (Sverigetopplistan)	67
Switzerland (Schweizer Hitparade)	44
UK Singles (Official Charts Company)	18
US Billboard Hot 100	96

2018 year-end chart performance for "Havana"
Chart (2018)	Position
Argentina (Monitor Latino)	1
Australia (ARIA)	23
Austria (Ö3 Austria Top 40)	38
Belgium (Ultratop Flanders)	11
Belgium R&B/Hip-Hop (Ultratop Flanders)	1
Belgium (Ultratop Wallonia)	6
Belgium R&B/Hip-Hop (Ultratop Wallonia)	2
Brazil (Crowley Broadcast Analysis)	60
Bulgaria International (PROPHON)	3
Canada (Canadian Hot 100)	1
CIS (Tophit)	28
Denmark (Tracklisten)	28
El Salvador (Monitor Latino)	19
Estonia (IFPI)	28
France (SNEP)	9
Germany (Official German Charts)	14
Hungary (Dance Top 40)	1
Hungary (Rádiós Top 40)	1
Hungary (Single Top 40)	4
Iceland (Plötutíóindi)	6
Ireland (IRMA)	26
Italy (FIMI)	43
Japan (Japan Hot 100)	66
Netherlands (Dutch Top 40)	37
Netherlands (Single Top 100)	25
New Zealand (Recorded Music NZ)	18
Portugal (AFP)	11
Romania (Airplay 100)	13
Russia (Tophit)	68
Slovenia (SloTop50)	4
South Korea (Gaon)	11
South Korea International (Gaon)	1
Spain (PROMUSICAE)	43
Sweden (Sverigetopplistan)	36
Switzerland (Schweizer Hitparade)	6
UK Singles (Official Charts Company)	17
US Billboard Hot 100	4
US Adult Contemporary (Billboard)	8
US Adult Pop Songs (Billboard)	13
US Dance/Mix Show Airplay (Billboard)	9
US Latin Pop Songs (Billboard)	19
US Mainstream Top 40 (Billboard)	9
US Radio Songs (Billboard)	4
US Rhythmic (Billboard)	23
Worldwide	1

2019 year-end chart performance for "Havana"
Chart (2019)	Position
CIS (Tophit)	185
Hungary (Dance Top 40)	16
Hungary (Rádiós Top 40)	70
Portugal (AFP)	195
Slovenia (SloTop50)	42
South Korea (Gaon)	117
Ukraine Airplay (Tophit)	80
US Adult Contemporary (Billboard)	41

2020 year-end chart performance for "Havana"
Chart (2020)	Position
Hungary (Dance Top 40)	76

2022 year-end chart performance for "Havana"
Chart (2022)	Position
Hungary (Rádiós Top 40)	44

2023 year-end chart performance for "Havana"
Chart (2023)	Position
Hungary (Rádiós Top 40)	74

2024 year-end chart performance for "Havana"
Chart (2024)	Position
Hungary (Rádiós Top 40)	63
Lithuania Airplay (TopHit)	169

2025 year-end chart performance for "Havana"
Chart (2025)	Position
Lithuania Airplay (TopHit)	95

=== Decade-end charts ===
Decade-end chart performance for "Havana"
Chart (2010–2019)	Position
Australia (ARIA)	63
Germany (Official German Charts)	32
UK Singles (Official Charts Company)	37
US Billboard Hot 100	59

== Certifications ==
Certifications and sales for "Havana"
Region	Certification	Certified units/sales
Argentina (CAPIF)	Platinum	20,000^{*}
Australia (ARIA)	10× Platinum	700,000^{‡}
Austria (IFPI Austria)	2× Platinum	60,000^{‡}
Belgium (BRMA)	2× Platinum	40,000^{‡}
Brazil (Pro-Música Brasil)	3× Diamond	750,000^{‡}
Canada (Music Canada)	Diamond	800,000^{‡}
Denmark (IFPI Danmark)	3× Platinum	270,000^{‡}
France (SNEP)	Diamond	233,333^{‡}
Germany (BVMI)	Diamond	1,000,000^{‡}
Italy (FIMI)	4× Platinum	200,000^{‡}
Mexico (AMPROFON)	Diamond+3× Platinum	480,000^{‡}
New Zealand (RMNZ)	7× Platinum	210,000^{‡}
Norway (IFPI Norway)	2× Platinum	120,000^{‡}
Poland (ZPAV)	Diamond	100,000^{‡}
Portugal (AFP)	4× Platinum	40,000^{‡}
Spain (Promusicae)	4× Platinum	160,000^{‡}
Spain (Promusicae) Remix version	Platinum	40,000^{‡}
Switzerland (IFPI Switzerland)	7× Platinum	140,000^{‡}
United Kingdom (BPI)	5× Platinum	3,000,000^{‡}
United States (RIAA)	Diamond	10,000,000^{‡}
Streaming
Japan (RIAJ)	Gold	50,000,000^{†}
South Korea	—	100,000,000
Sweden (GLF)	5× Platinum	40,000,000^{†}
^{*} Sales figures based on certification alone.^{‡} Sales+streaming figures based on certification alone.^{†} Streaming-only figures based on certification alone.

== Release history ==
List of release dates, showing region, release format(s), version(s), label(s) and reference(s)
Region	Date	Format(s)	Version(s)	Label(s)	Ref.
Various	August 3, 2017	Digital download; streaming	Original	Epic; Syco	
Italy	September 8, 2017	Contemporary hit radio	Original	Sony	
United States	October 3, 2017	Contemporary hit radio	Original	Epic	
United States	October 3, 2017	Rhythmic contemporary radio	Original	Epic	
Various	November 12, 2017	Digital download; streaming	Daddy Yankee remix	Epic; Syco	
France	November 24, 2017	Digital download; streaming	Original	Epic; Syco	
United States	November 24, 2017	Digital download; streaming	Original	Epic; Syco	
Germany	December 15, 2017	CD single	Original; Daddy Yankee remix	Sony	
Various	September 21, 2018	Digital download; streaming	Live	Epic; Syco	

== See also ==
- It is usually played at the World Scholar's Cup to usually annoy the scholars by cutting songs like Raining Tacos and repeatedly going back to the start of the song.
- List of best-selling singles worldwide by year
- List of Billboard Hot 100 number-one singles of 2018
- List of Billboard Digital Song Sales number-one singles of 2017
- List of Billboard Radio Songs number-one singles of 2017
- List of Billboard Streaming Songs number-one singles of 2018
- List of Billboard Adult Top 40 number-one songs of 2018
- List of Billboard Mainstream Top 40 number-one songs of 2017
- List of Billboard Mainstream Top 40 number-one songs of 2018
- List of Billboard Rhythmic number-one songs of 2018
- List of Billboard Dance/Mix Show Airplay number-one songs of 2017
- List of Canadian Hot 100 number-one singles of 2017
- List of Canadian Hot 100 number-one singles of 2018
- List of UK Singles Chart number ones of 2017
- List of number-one hits of 2018 (France)
- List of airplay number-one hits of the 2010s (Argentina)
- List of number-one singles of 2017 (Australia)
- List of number-one digital tracks of 2017 (Australia)
- List of number-one digital tracks of 2018 (Australia)
- List of number-one singles of 2017 (Ireland)
- List of number-one songs of 2017 (Mexico)
- List of number-one singles of 2017 (Poland)
- List of number-one singles of 2018 (Portugal)
- List of number-one singles of 2017 (Scotland)
- List of number-one singles of 2017 (Slovenia)
- List of number-one international songs of 2018 (South Korea)
- List of best-selling singles in South Korea by year
