= List of number-one international songs of 2018 (South Korea) =

The international Gaon Digital Chart is a chart that ranks the best-performing international songs in South Korea. The data is collected by the Korea Music Content Association. Below is a list of songs that topped the weekly and monthly charts, as according to the Gaon 국외 (Foreign) Digital Chart. The Digital Chart ranks songs according to their performance on the Gaon Download, Streaming, and BGM charts.

== Weekly charts ==
| Week ending date | Song | Artist(s) | Ref. |
|---|---|---|---|
| January 6 | "Havana" | Camila Cabello featuring Young Thug | |
| January 13 | "Havana" | Camila Cabello featuring Young Thug | |
| January 20 | "Havana" | Camila Cabello featuring Young Thug | |
| January 27 | "Havana" | Camila Cabello featuring Young Thug | |
| February 3 | "Havana" | Camila Cabello featuring Young Thug | |
| February 10 | "Havana" | Camila Cabello featuring Young Thug | |
| February 17 | "Havana" | Camila Cabello featuring Young Thug | |
| February 24 | "Havana" | Camila Cabello featuring Young Thug | |
| March 3 | "Havana" | Camila Cabello featuring Young Thug | |
| March 10 | "HandClap" | Fitz and the Tantrums | |
| March 17 | "HandClap" | Fitz and the Tantrums | |
| March 24 | "HandClap" | Fitz and the Tantrums | |
| March 31 | "HandClap" | Fitz and the Tantrums | |
| April 7 | "HandClap" | Fitz and the Tantrums | |
| April 14 | "HandClap" | Fitz and the Tantrums | |
| April 21 | "HandClap" | Fitz and the Tantrums | |
| April 28 | "HandClap" | Fitz and the Tantrums | |
| May 5 | "HandClap" | Fitz and the Tantrums | |
| May 12 | "HandClap" | Fitz and the Tantrums | |
| May 19 | "HandClap" | Fitz and the Tantrums | |
| May 26 | "HandClap" | Fitz and the Tantrums | |
| June 2 | "HandClap" | Fitz and the Tantrums | |
| June 9 | "HandClap" | Fitz and the Tantrums | |
| June 16 | "HandClap" | Fitz and the Tantrums | |
| June 23 | "HandClap" | Fitz and the Tantrums | |
| June 30 | "HandClap" | Fitz and the Tantrums | |
| July 7 | "Havana" | Camila Cabello featuring Young Thug | |
| July 14 | "Havana" | Camila Cabello featuring Young Thug | |
| July 21 | "Havana" | Camila Cabello featuring Young Thug | |
| July 28 | "Havana" | Camila Cabello featuring Young Thug | |
| August 4 | "HandClap" | Fitz and the Tantrums | |
| August 11 | "Havana" | Camila Cabello featuring Young Thug | |
| August 18 | "Havana" | Camila Cabello featuring Young Thug | |
| August 25 | "Havana" | Camila Cabello featuring Young Thug | |
| September 1 | "Havana" | Camila Cabello featuring Young Thug | |
| September 8 | "Havana" | Camila Cabello featuring Young Thug | |
| September 15 | "Havana" | Camila Cabello featuring Young Thug | |
| September 22 | "Havana" | Camila Cabello featuring Young Thug | |
| September 29 | "Havana" | Camila Cabello featuring Young Thug | |
| October 6 | "Havana" | Camila Cabello featuring Young Thug | |
| October 13 | "Havana" | Camila Cabello featuring Young Thug | |
| October 20 | "HandClap" | Fitz and the Tantrums | |
| October 27 | "HandClap" | Fitz and the Tantrums | |
| November 3 | "HandClap" | Fitz and the Tantrums | |
| November 10 | "Pop/Stars" | (G)I-dle, Madison Beer and Jaira Burns (as K/DA) | |
| November 17 | "Pop/Stars" | (G)I-dle, Madison Beer and Jaira Burns (as K/DA) | |
| November 24 | "Thank U, Next" | Ariana Grande | |
| December 1 | "Thank U, Next" | Ariana Grande | |
| December 8 | "Thank U, Next" | Ariana Grande | |
| December 15 | "Thank U, Next" | Ariana Grande | |
| December 22 | "Thank U, Next" | Ariana Grande | |
| December 29 | "Santa Tell Me" | Ariana Grande | |

== Monthly charts ==
| Month | Song | Artist(s) | Ref. |
|---|---|---|---|
| January | "Havana" | Camila Cabello featuring Young Thug | |
| February | "Havana" | Camila Cabello featuring Young Thug | |
| March | "HandClap" | Fitz and the Tantrums | |
| April | "HandClap" | Fitz and the Tantrums | |
| May | "HandClap" | Fitz and the Tantrums | |
| June | "HandClap" | Fitz and the Tantrums | |
| July | "Havana" | Camila Cabello featuring Young Thug | |
| August | "Havana" | Camila Cabello featuring Young Thug | |
| September | "Havana" | Camila Cabello featuring Young Thug | |
| October | "HandClap" | Fitz and the Tantrums | |
| November | "Pop/Stars" | (G)I-dle, Madison Beer and Jaira Burns (as K/DA) | |
| December | "Thank U, Next" | Ariana Grande | |
