= Beoga =

Irish folk band

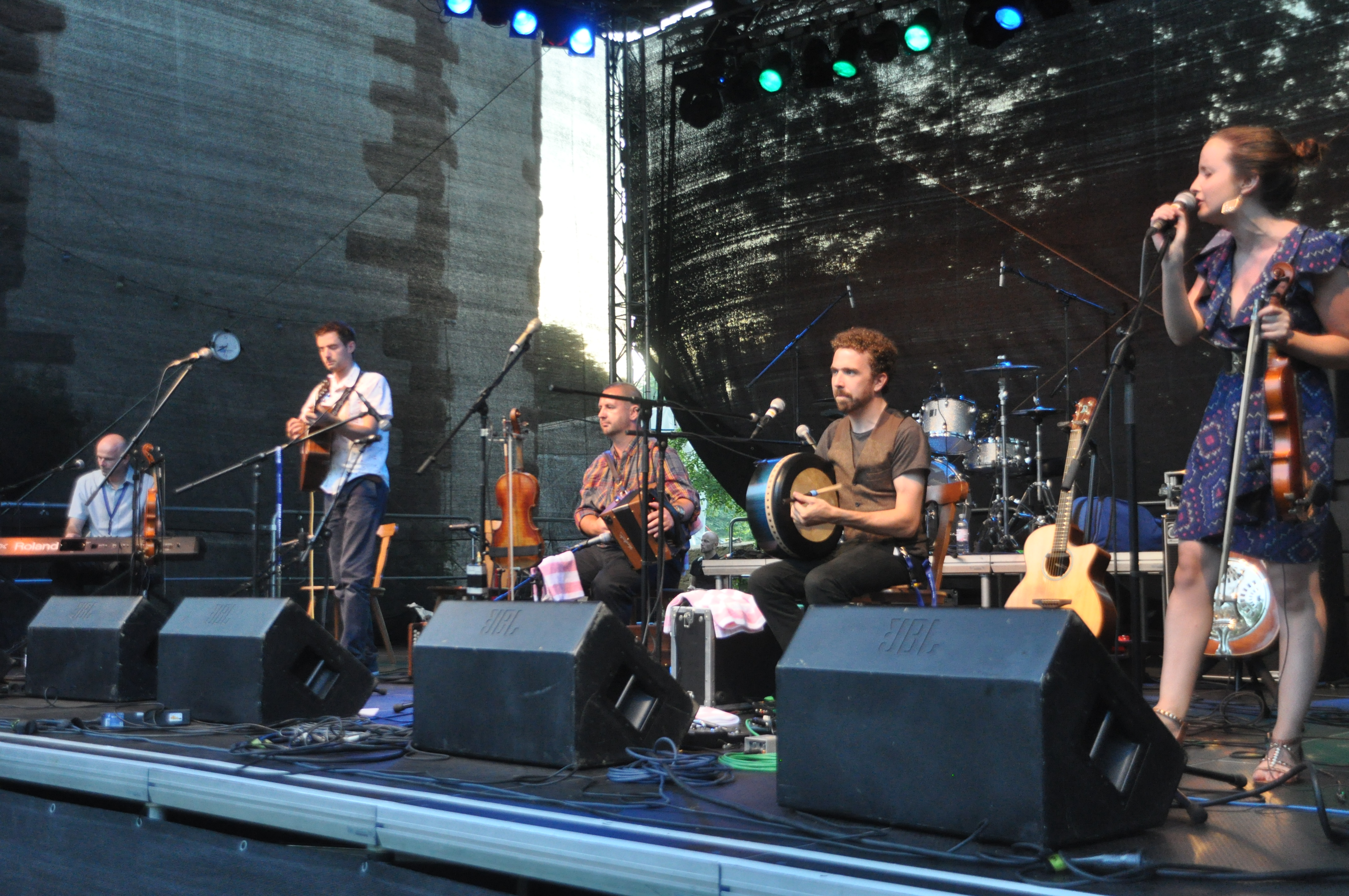
- Performing at "Folk am Neckar" in Neckarelz, 2013

Background information
- Origin: County Antrim
- Genre: Irish folk
- Years active: 2002–present
- Members: Damian McKee; Eamon Murray; Liam Bradley; Niamh Dunne; Seán Óg Graham
- Website: www.beogamusic.com

Beoga ([ˈbʲoː.ɡə], B'YOH-ga, Irish: 'vivid, lively') are an Irish folk band. They were formed in County Kerry in 2002 at the All-Ireland Fleadh, although the original four members of the band hail from County Antrim and County Londonderry in Northern Ireland. The line-up features Damian McKee on accordion, multi-instrumentalist Seán Óg Graham, pianist Liam Bradley and Eamon Murray on bodhrán. Niamh Dunne, from County Limerick, joined in 2005, on vocals and fiddle.

In 2016, Beoga collaborated with Ed Sheeran on the songs "Galway Girl" and "Nancy Mulligan". They subsequently played with Sheeran many times, including during Sheeran's headlining set at Glastonbury Festival. In 2026, Beoga dropped out of Sheeran's Loop Tour in protest after venue owners pressured support act Macklemore, to leave the tour due to his pro-Palestine commentary.

== History ==
Their 2007 album Mischief was voted one of the top folk albums of 2007 at the Live Ireland Music Awards and the German Music Awards. Their third album, The Incident, was shortlisted for a 2010 Grammy Award nomination, in the Best Contemporary World Music Album category. In that year they were awarded a U.S. House of Representatives Certificate of Congressional Recognition and were described by The Wall Street Journal as "the most exciting new traditional band to emerge from Ireland this century."

In 2016 Ed Sheeran invited Beoga to contribute to his album ÷. They co-wrote the song "Galway Girl" using parts of the track "Minute 5" from their album How to Tune a Fish. They are also featured on the song "Nancy Mulligan". On 25 June 2017 the band backed Sheeran for a performance of "Nancy Mulligan" during his headline performance at Glastonbury Festival 2017.

The mini-album Carousel released in May 2020 showed a style change towards pop music, with the guest musicians a strong influence. In April 2021 the band released five instrumental tracks on the EP Breathe, which mix the structures of traditional Irish tunes with elements of pop music.

In 2026, Beoga returned as Sheeran's backing band for the North American leg of his Loop Tour. Beoga played for the folk-inspired portion of the set list, which included "Galway Girl" and "Nancy Mulligan". However, after an opening act, Macklemore, was removed from the tour after controversy related to saying "Free Palestine" in concerts, Beoga left the tour in protest. Beoga later released a statement which read, "We are a traditional Irish band who never saw ourselves playing in stadiums of that size and that opportunity is not lost on us. We have been friends with Ed for over 10 years now and will continue to be. We believe in dialogue as a means of progressing the plight of the Palestinian people. As musicians, playing to those crowds every night is the stuff of dreams but to play in venues that silence anyone advocating for a Free Palestine is simply not an option for us... As founding members of the Irish Artists for Palestine movement, we are committed activists for justice and will continue to be."

== Gallery ==
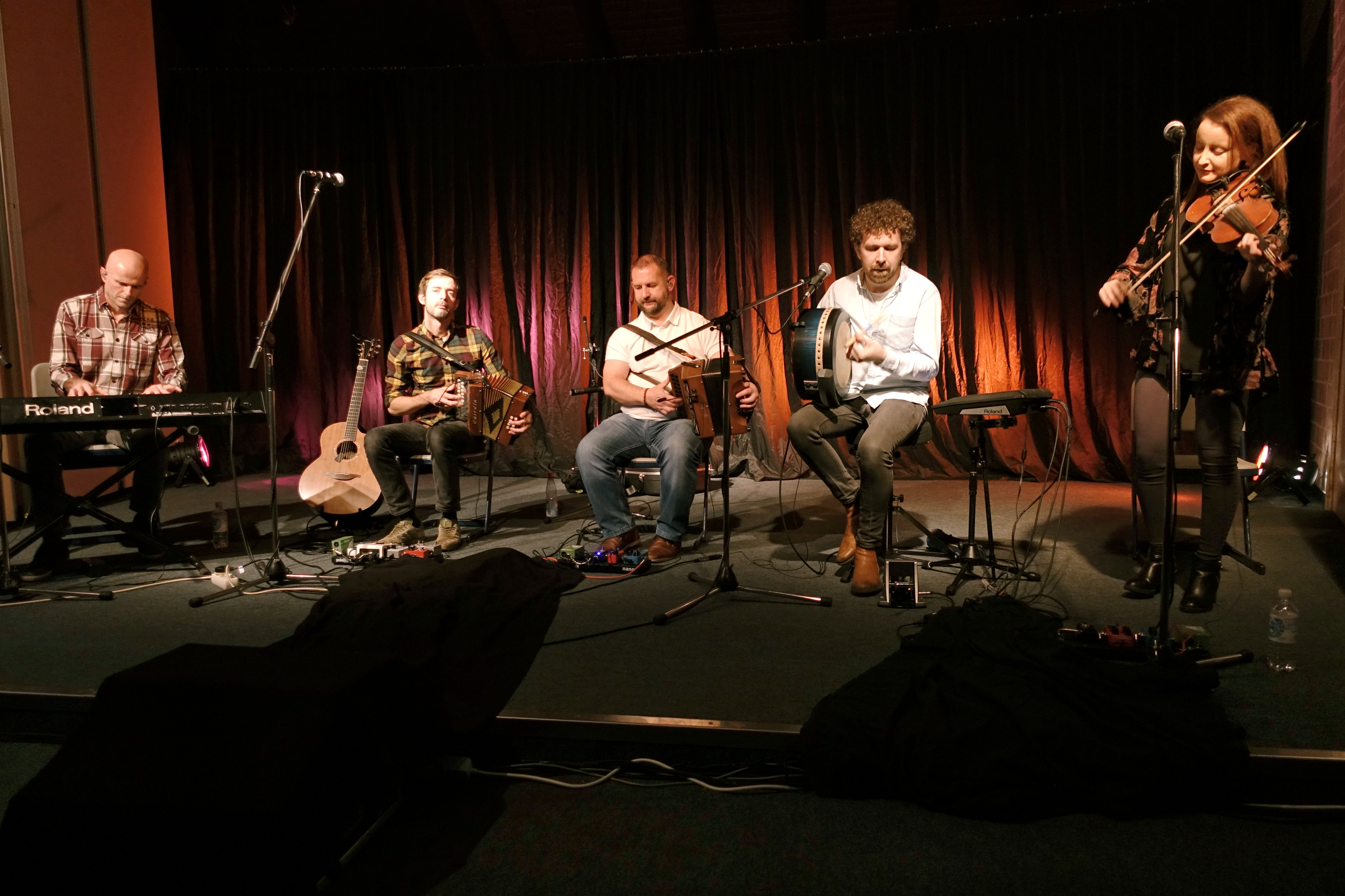
Beoga 2017

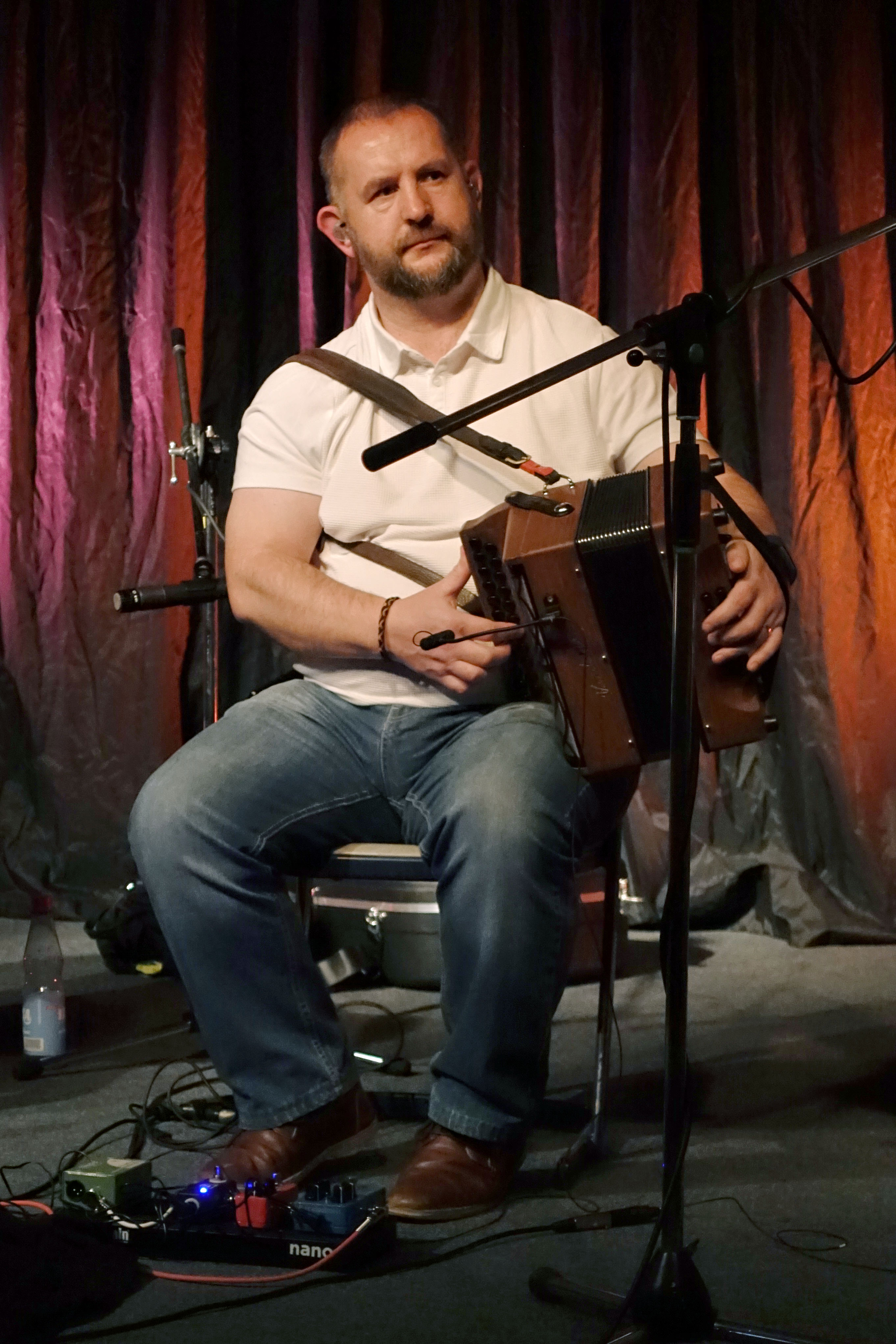
Damian McKee

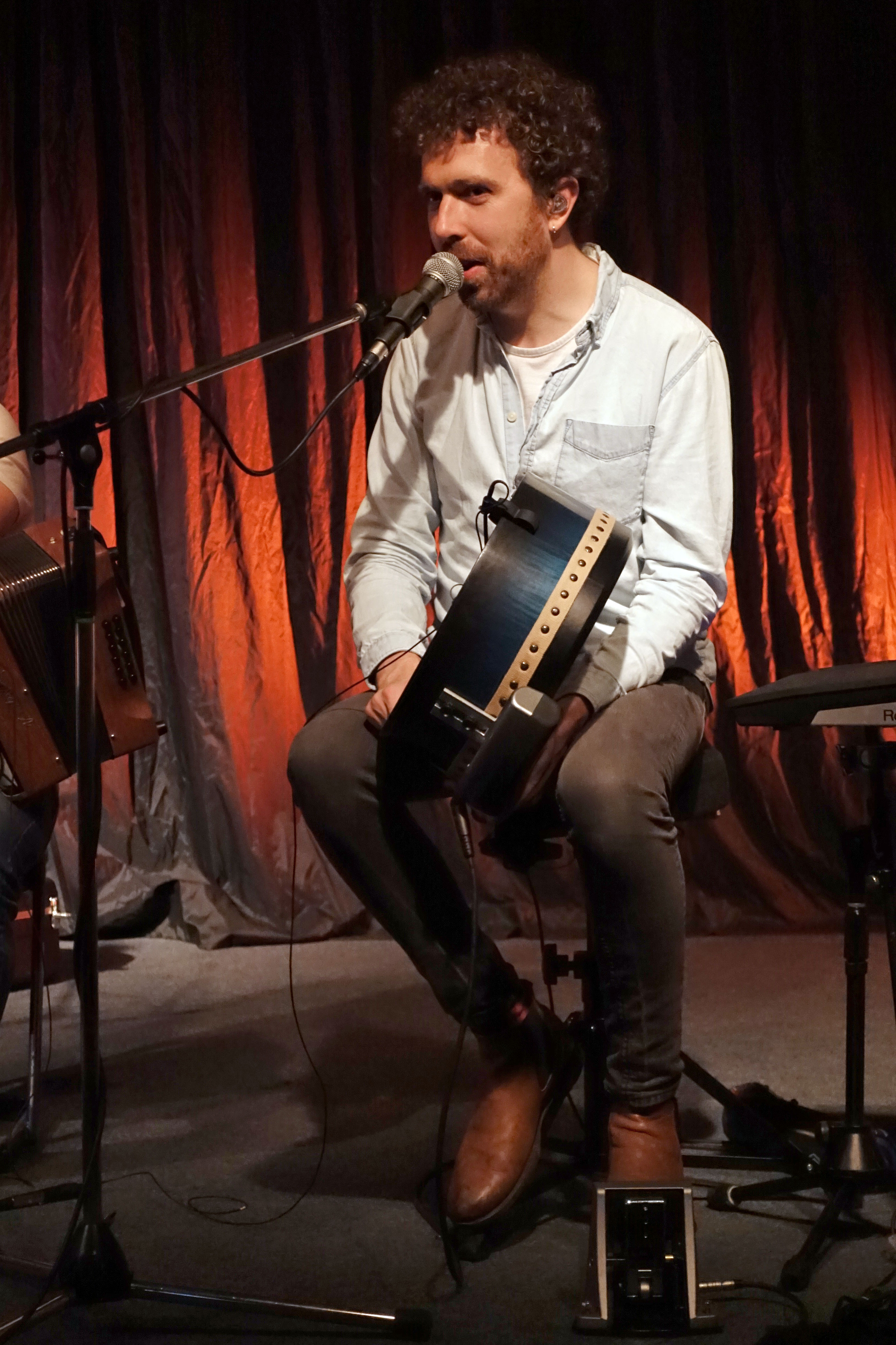
Eamon Murray

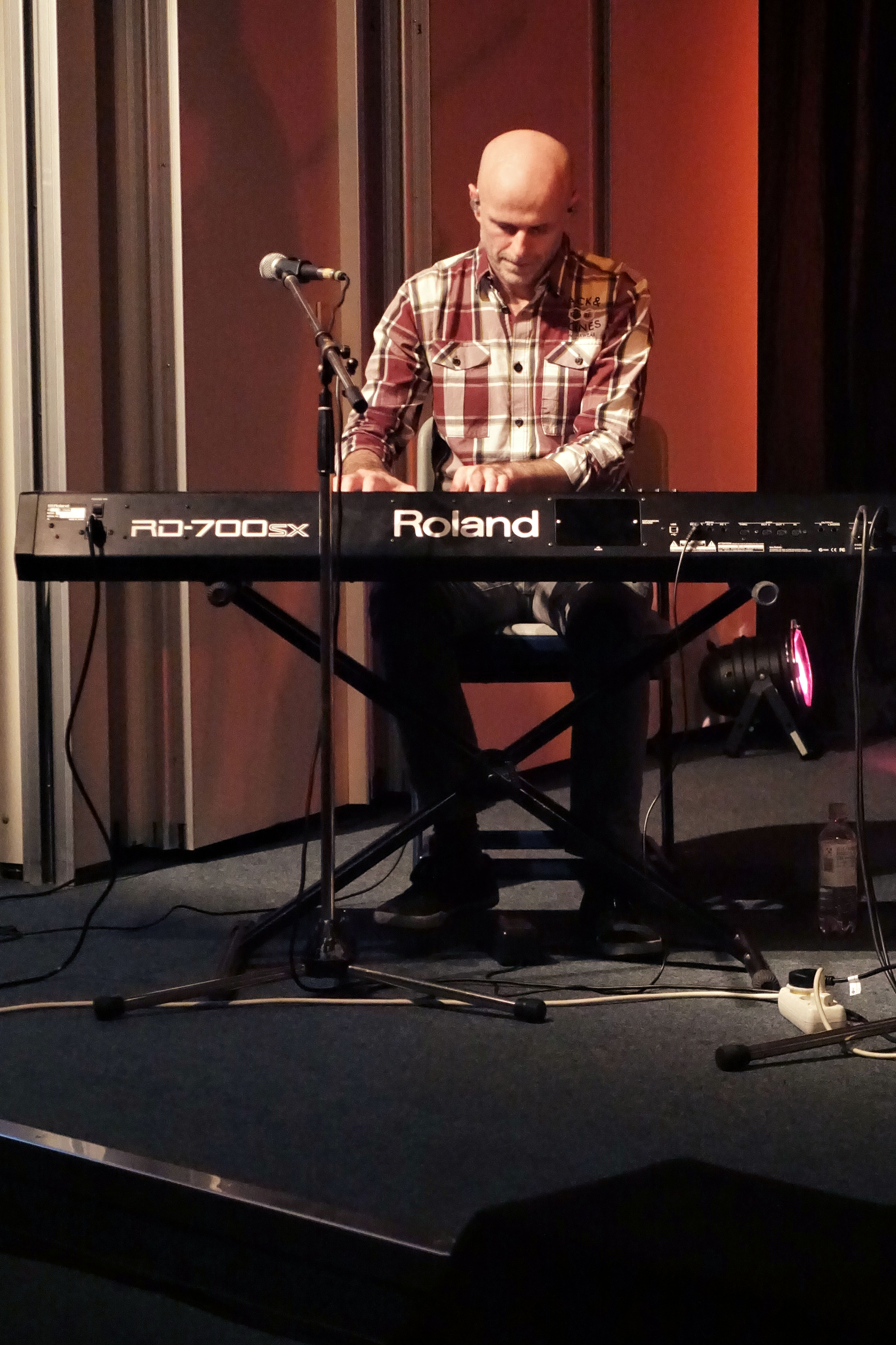
Liam Bradley

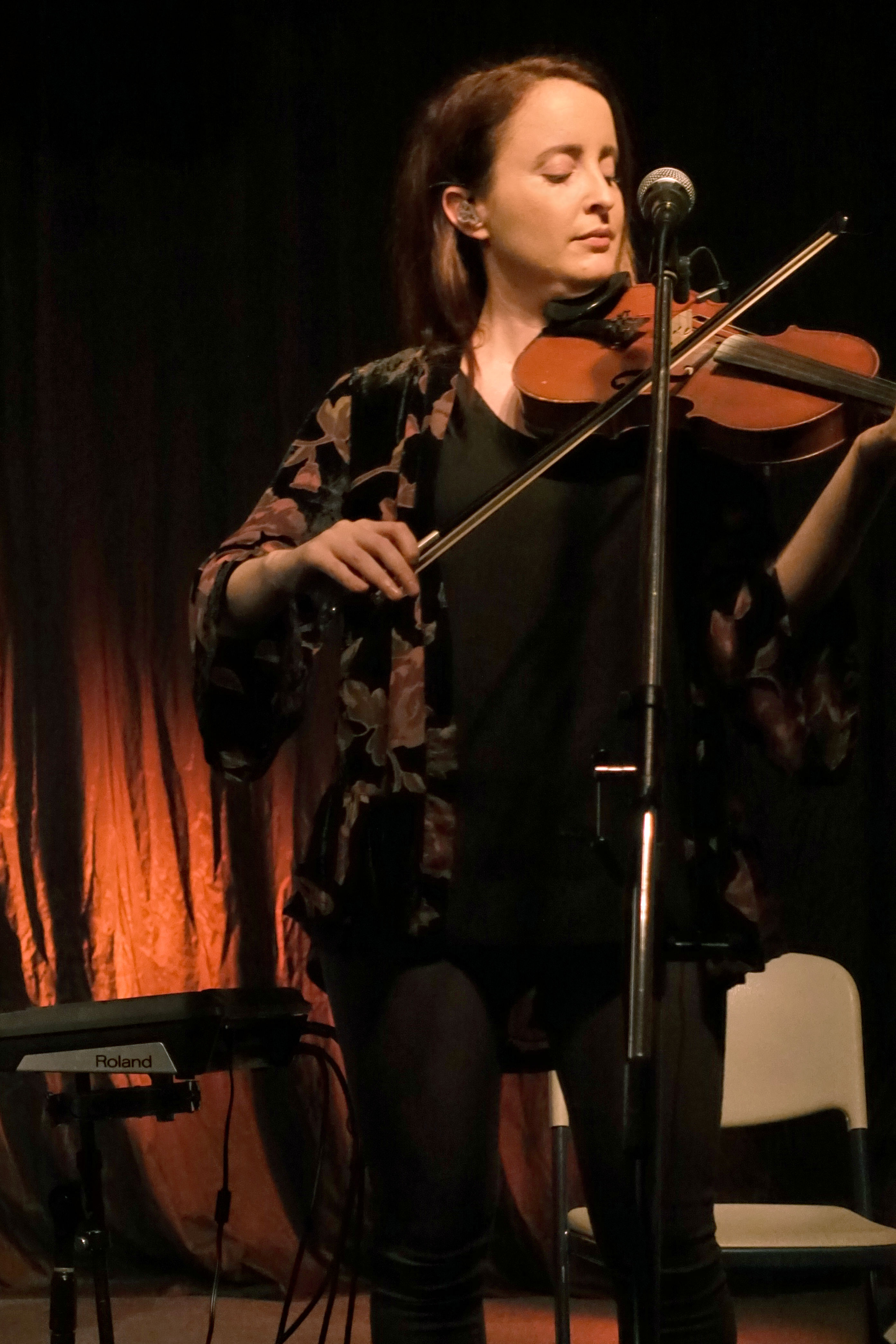
Niamh Dunne

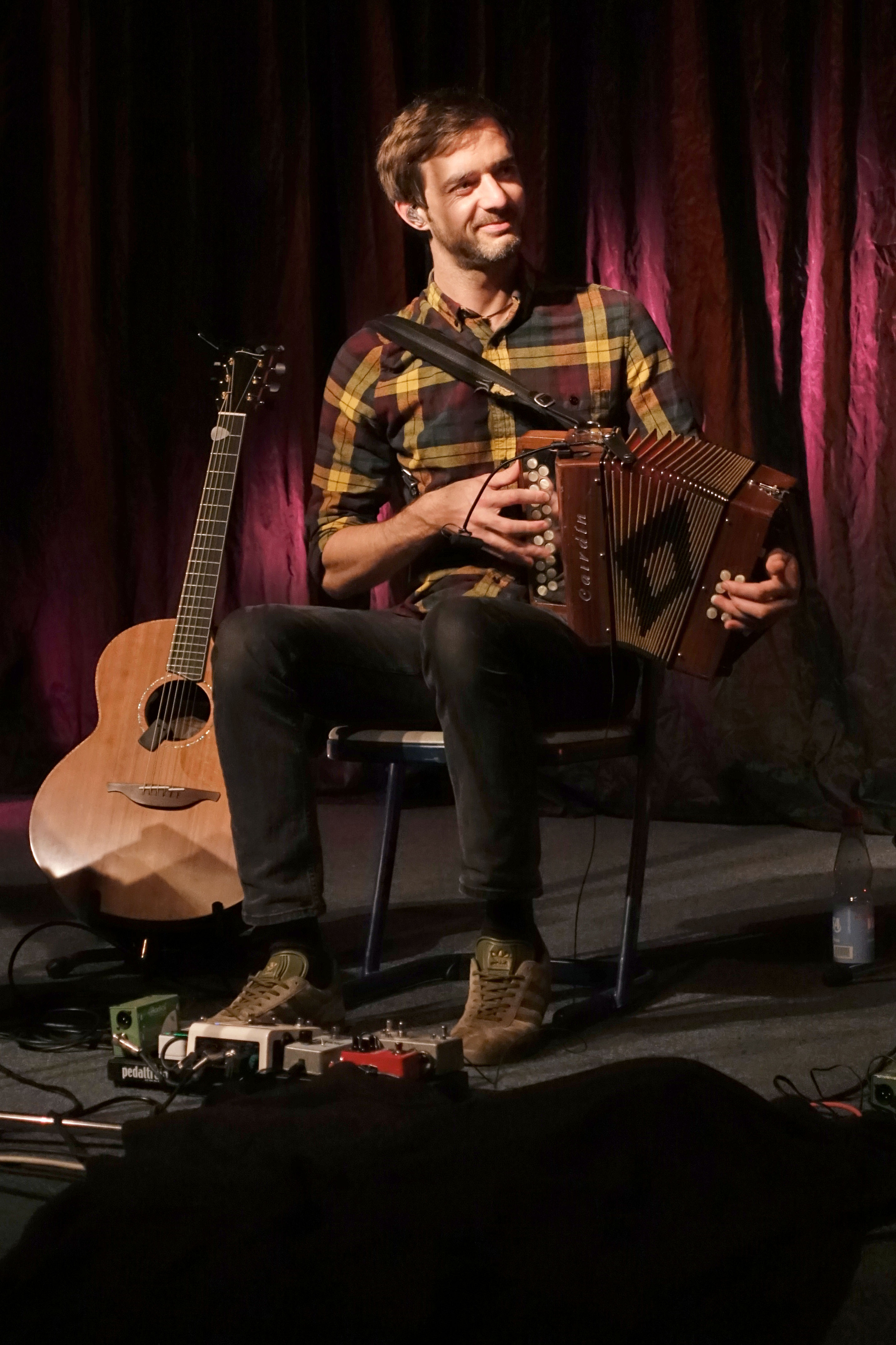
Seán Óg Graham

== Discography ==
- A Lovely Madness (2004)
- Mischief (2007)
- The Incident (2009)
- Live at Stockfisch Studio (2010)
- How to Tune a Fish (2011)
- Beoga – Live at 10: The 10th Anniversary Concert (2013)
- Before We Change Our Mind (2016)
- Carousel (2020)
- Breathe (2021)
- Phases (2025)
