= List of songs by Anne-Marie =

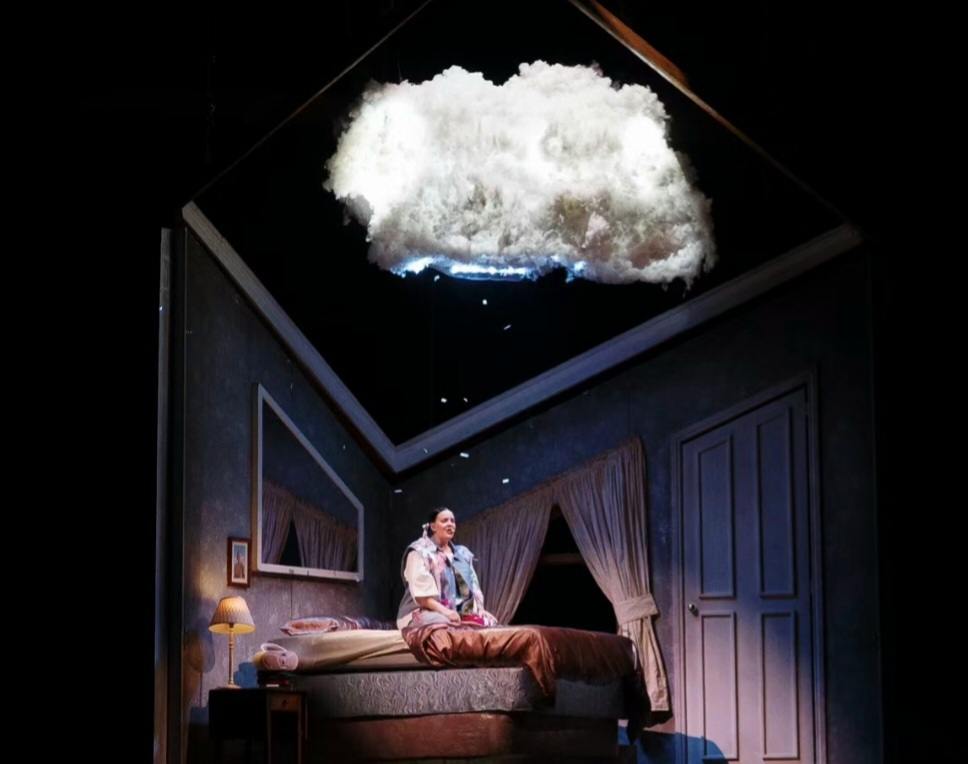
Anne-Marie performing in 2023 during her Unhealthy Club Tour

The English singer-songwriter Anne-Marie has written many songs within her three-album discography, as well as having sung many songs not written by her and having written many songs for other artists.

After a chance meeting, Anne-Marie secured recording time in Rocket Studios, owned by Elton John, which signed her to a recording contract after hearing her sing. On Rocket, she released the demo "Summer Girl" in 2013. It attracted attention when Ed Sheeran linked to it on his Twitter account. A possible solo career was curtailed for her to develop herself as an artist. She has been signed to Asylum Records since 2015. In 2015, she released her debut EP Karate under Rudimental's label Major Tom's. In 2018, Anne-Marie released her debut studio album Speak Your Mind, described as pop and EDM which was produced by Jennifer Decilveo, Nick Monson, Amir Amor, Chris Loco, Marshmello, The Invisible Men, MNEK, TMS, Teddy Geiger, Fred Ball, Fraser T. Smith, Jack Patterson of Clean Bandit, Mark Ralph, David Guetta, and Steve Mac, among others. After scrapping an album entirely and releasing several non-album singles, she released her second studio album, Therapy (2021), a pop album produced by TMS, Digital Farm Animals, Mojam, Nathan Dawe, Grades, Sire Noah, Lostboye, Cameron Gower Poole, Oak, Jean-Marie, Rudimental, Elvira Anderfjärd, Blake Slatkin, and Fred Ball. Her third studio album, Unhealthy (2023), was produced by Mojam, Billen Ted, siblings Connor and Riley McDonough, and Evan Blair. It is pop and dance-pop.

== Released songs ==
Key
†	Indicates a cover of another artist's previous work
#	Indicates a remix of another artist's previous work

List of songs by name, including featured performers, writers, associated album(s), and release year(s)
Song	Artist(s)	Writer(s)	Album(s)	Release year	Ref.
"2002"	Anne-Marie	Benjamin Levin; Steve Mac; Julia Michaels; Anne-Marie Nicholson; Ed Sheeran	Speak Your Mind	2018	
"Alarm"	Anne-Marie	Wayne Hector; Mason Levy; Anne-Marie Nicholson; Ina Wroldsen	Speak Your Mind	2016	
"Alien"	Morgan	Anne-Marie Nicholson; Ellis Taylor; Morgan Connie Smith; Thomas Jules	Alien	2020	
"All That Love"	Rudimental featuring Anne-Marie	Amir Amor; James Newman; Jonny Harris; Julie Frost; Leon Rolle; Nick Gale; Piers Aggett; Wayne Hector; Kesi Drdyen	We the Generation (Deluxe Edition)	2015	
"Alright with Me"	Wretch 32 featuring Anne-Marie and Prgrshn	Emeli Sandé; Jermaine Scott; Jonny Coffer	Non-album song	2015	
"Baby Don't Hurt Me"	David Guetta, Anne-Marie and Coi Leray	Akil King; Anne-Marie Nicholson; Coi Leray Collins; David Guetta; Tony Hendrik; Ed Sheeran; Feli Ferraro; Johnny McDaid; Junior Torello; Mikkel Cox; Steve Mac; Tobias Fredericksen	Unhealthy (Super Unhealthy edition)	2023	
"Bad Girlfriend"	Anne-Marie	Paul Blair; Mark Nilian, Jr. Nick Monson; Anne-Marie Nicholson; Sasha Alex Sloan	Speak Your Mind	2018	
"Beautiful"	Anne-Marie	Ed Sheeran; Elvira Anderfjärd; Max Martin	Therapy	2021	
"Bedroom"	JJ Lin featuring Anne-Marie	Anne-Marie Nicholson; Ben Kohn; Camille Purcell; Pete Kelleher; Tom Barnes	Therapy (Japanese edition) (Note: "Bedroom" also appears on JJ Lin's album Drifter / Like You Do)	2021	
"Besándote" (remix) #	Piso 21 featuring Anne-Marie	Alejandro Patiño; Anne-Marie Nicholson; David Escobar Gallego; Jennifer Decilveo; Juan David Castaño; Juan David Huertas Clavijo; Pablo Mejia; Salomon Villada Hoyos	Non-album song	2017	
"Better Not Together"	Anne-Marie	Anne-Marie Nicholson; Camille Purcell; Nathan Dawe; Tre Jean-Marie; Uzoechi Emenike	Therapy	2021	
"Better Off"	Anne-Marie	Andrew Murray; Anne-Marie Nicholson; Grace Barker; Henry Tucker; James Terrence Murray; Mustafa Omer	Unhealthy (Deluxe)	2023	
"Birthday"	Anne-Marie	Anne-Marie Nicholson; Brittany Amaradio; Keith Sorrells; Warren Felder	Therapy (Japanese edition)	2020	
"Boy"	Anne-Marie	Anne-Marie Nicholson; Jonny Lattimer	Non-album song	2015	
"Breathing"	Anne-Marie	Anne-Marie Nicholson; Fred Ball; Rachel Keen	Therapy	2021	
"Breathing Fire"	Anne-Marie	Anne-Marie Nicholson; Ina Wroldsen; Steve Mac	Speak Your Mind (Deluxe)	2018	
"Bridge over Troubled Water" (Note: Simon & Garfunkel cover) †	Artists for Grenfell (Note: Composed of Anne-Marie, Angel, Dua Lipa, James Arthur, Carl Barât, James Blunt, Roger Daltrey, Craig David, Deno, Donae'o, Fleur East, Mr Eazi, Ella Eyre, Paloma Faith, Shane Filan, Matt Goss, Tom Grennan, Tony Hadley, Geri Halliwell, Ella Henderson, Jessie J, Louisa Johnson, Kelly Jones, Labrinth, Leona Lewis, the London Community Gospel Choir, Pixie Lott, Gareth Malone and The Choir for Grenfell, Brian May, Jon McClure, 5 After Midnight, Tokio Myers, John Newman, Omar, Rita Ora, Liam Payne, Gregory Porter, Nile Rodgers, Emeli Sandé, Ray BLK, Raye, Shakka, Jorja Smith, Dan Smith, Stormzy, Nathan Sykes, Matt Terry, Louis Tomlinson, Pete Townshend, Tulisa, Jessie Ware, Robbie Williams and WSTRN)	Paul Simon	Non-album song	2017	
"Can I Get Your Number"	Anne-Marie	Anne-Marie Nicholson; Ben Kohn; Jennifer Decilveo; Peter Kelleher; Thomas Barnes	Speak Your Mind	2018	
"Catch 22"	Illy featuring Anne-Marie	Alasdair Murray; Grant Michael; Suzy Shinn; Mark Landon	Two Degrees	2016	
"C'est Fini"	Rudimental featuring Rv and Lowkey	Amir Amor; Anne-Marie Nicholson; Connor Bellis; Ester Dean; George Conway; Jordan Townsend; Kareem Dennis; Leon Rolle; Piers Aggett; Matthew Kopp; Sam Knowles; Kesi Dryden	Ground Control	2021	
"Christmas Without You"	Anne-Marie	Anne-Marie Nicholson; Tyron Frampton; James Blake Litherland; James Murray; Mustafa Omer	Your Christmas or Mine 2 (Original Motion Picture Soundtrack)	2023	
"Ciao Adios"	Anne-Marie	Anne-Marie Nicholson; Jennifer Decilveo; Mason Levy; Tom Meredith	Speak Your Mind	2017	
"Colour"	MNEK featuring Hailee Steinfeld	Anne-Marie Nicholson; Arthur Smith; Raoul Chen; Uzoechi Emenike	Language	2018	
"Come Over"	Rudimental featuring Anne-Marie and Tion Wayne	Amir Amor; Anne-Marie Nicholson; Dennis Junior Odunwo; Leon Rolle; Olivia Devine; Piers Aggett; Kesi Dryden	Ground Control	2020	
"Coming Your Way"	Michaël Brun, Anne-Marie and Becky G	Anne-Marie Nicholson; Manuel Lorente Freire; Michaël Brun; Rebecca Marie Gomez; Tia Scola	Fami Vol. 1	2023	
"Cry"	Anne-Marie	Anne-Marie Nicholson; Jennifer Decilveo	Speak Your Mind	2018	
"Cry Baby"	Clean Bandit, Anne-Marie and David Guetta	Anne-Marie Nicholson; Camille Purcell; Jack Patterson; Steve Mac	TBA	2024	
"Cuckoo"	Anne-Marie	Anne-Marie Nicholson; Connor Blake; Henry Tucker; Sam Brennan; Tom Hollings	Unhealthy	2023	
"Depressed"	Anne-Marie	Anne-Marie Nicholson; Grace Barker; Henry Tucker; Ryan Linvill	TBA	2025	
"Distance"	Becky Hill	Adam Argyle; Anne-Marie Nicholson; Matthew Coleman; Rebecca Claire Hill; Thomas Jules	Only Honest on the Weekend	2021	
"Do It Right"	Anne-Marie	Anne-Marie Nicholson; Thomas Jules	Non-album song	2015	
"Don't Leave Me Alone"	David Guetta featuring Anne-Marie	David Guetta; Linus Wiklund; Noonie Bao; Sarah Aarons	Speak Your Mind (Deluxe) (Note: "Don't Leave Me Alone" also appears on David Guetta's album 7)	2018	
"Don't Panic"	Anne-Marie	Anne-Marie Nicholson; Castle; Riley McDonough; Connor McDonough	If You're Looking For a New Best Friend	2025	
"Don't Play"	Anne-Marie, KSI and Digital Farm Animals	Andy Murray; Anne-Marie Nicholson; James Murray; Mustafa Omer; Nick Gale; Olajide Olatunji; Pablo Bowman; Richard Boardman; Sam Gumbley	Therapy (Note: "Don't Play" also appears on KSI's album All Over the Place)	2021	
"Eenie Meenie"	Chung Ha featuring Hongjoong	Sara Boe; Kim Chung-ha; Kim Chanmi; Kim Hongjoong; Connor Blake; Tree Plum; Samuel Brennan; Thomas Hollings; Kyoung Cho-yun; Anne-Marie Nicholson	Non-album song	2024	
"Either Way"	Snakehips and Anne-Marie featuring Joey Badass	James David; Julia Michaels; Oliver Dickinson; Trevor Brown; Warren Felder; William Simmons	Non-album song	2017	
"Elevate"	Gorgon City featuring Anne-Marie	Ed Thomas; Kye Gibbon; Martyna Baker; Matthew Robson-Scott	Sirens	2014	
"Everywhere" (Note: Fleetwood Mac cover) †	Niall Horan and Anne-Marie	Christine McVie	Non-album song	2021	
"Expectations"	Anne-Marie, Minnie and i-dle	C'sa; Jonghan; Lim; Paprikaa	Unhealthy (Deluxe)	2023	
"Foreign World"	Rudimental featuring Anne-Marie	Amir Amor; Jean-Baptiste Kouame II; Leon Rolle; Lianne La Havas; Uzoechi Emenike; Piers Aggett; Kesi Dryden	We the Generation	2015	
"Flowers" (Note: Sweet Female Attitude cover) †	Anne-Marie	Martin Green; Mike Powell	Dermot O'Leary Presents the Saturday Sessions 2016	2016	
"Friends"	Marshmello and Anne-Marie	Nat Dunn; Marshmello; Anne-Marie Nicholson	Speak Your Mind	2018	
"Fuck, I'm Lonely"	Lauv featuring Anne-Marie	Ari Leff; Michael Matosic; Michael Pollack	How I'm Feeling	2019	
"Gemini"	Anne-Marie	Anne-Marie Nicholson; Benjamin Ash; Laura Dockrill	Karate	2015	
"Grudge"	Anne-Marie	Anne-Marie Nicholson; Connor Blake; Evan Blair; Nami Ondas; Tyron Frampton	Unhealthy	2023	
"Haunt You"	Anne-Marie	Anne-Marie Nicholson; Conor Blake; Sam Brennan; Sara Boe; Tom Hollings; Tre-Jean Marie	Unhealthy	2023	
"Heavy"	Anne-Marie	Anne-Marie Nicholson; George Astasio; Iain James; Jason Pebworth; Jon Shave; Tash Phillips	Speak Your Mind	2017	
"Her"	Anne-Marie	Anne-Marie Nicholson; Nat Dunn; Steve Mac	Non-album song	2020	
"Ick"	Anne-Marie	Anne-Marie Nicholson; Conor Blake; Sam Brennan; Sara Boe; Tom Hollings	Unhealthy (Deluxe)	2023	
"The Idea of You"	Nicholas Galitzine and Anne-Marie	Albin Nedler; Carl Falk; Savan Kotecha	The Idea of You (Original Motion Picture Soundtrack)	2024	
"I Don't Like Your Boyfriend"	Anne-Marie	Anne-Marie Nicholson; Casey Smith; Conor Blake; Sam Brennan; Tom Hollings	If You're Looking For a New Best Friend	2025	
"I Just Called"	Neiked, Anne-Marie and Latto	Bekah Novi; Jae Stephens; Alyssa Stephens; Neiked; Nicolas Aranda; Phillipe de Pena; Stevie Wonder; Adam von Mentzer	Non-album song	2022	
"I Love Me"	Demi Lovato	Alex Niceforo; Anne-Marie Nicholson; Jennifer Decilveo; Demi Lovato; Keith Sorrells; Warren Felder; Sean Douglas	Dancing with the Devil... the Art of Starting Over (Expanded Edition)	2020	
"Irish Goodbye"	Anne-Marie	Anne-Marie Nicholson; Henry Tucker; Sam Brennan; Tom Hollings; Tyron Frampton	Unhealthy	2023	
"Karate"	Anne-Marie	Anne-Marie Nicholson; Bradford Ellis; Laura Dockrill	Karate	2015	
"Kill Bill" (Note: Sza cover) †	Anne-Marie	Rob Bisel; Carter Lang; Solána Rowe	Apple Music Home Session – Anne-Marie	2023	
"Kills Me to Love You"	Anne-Marie	Anne-Marie Nicholson; Connor Blake; Sam Brennan; Sara Boe; Tom Hollings	Unhealthy	2023	
"Kiss My (Uh-Oh)"	Anne-Marie and Little Mix	Anne-Marie Nicholson; Edwin Perez; Jacob Gage Banfield; Camille Purcell; Lumidee Cedeno; Pete Nappi; Steven Marsden; Taylor Upsahl	Therapy	2021	
"Knock-Knock"	Anne-Marie	Anne-Marie Nicholson; Roxanne Emery; Sam Brennan; Tom Hollings	If You're Looking for a Reason to Key Your Ex's Car	2025	
"Leave (Get Out)" (Note: JoJo cover) †	Anne-Marie	Alex Cantrall; Kenneth Karlin; Soulshock; Phillip White	Spotify Singles	2018	
"Let Me Live"	Rudimental and Major Lazer featuring Anne-Marie and Mr Eazi	Amir Amor; Anne-Marie Nicholson; Bas van Daalen; Cesar Ovalle Jr. Jasper Helderman; Leon Rolle; Oluwatosin Ajibade; Phillip Meckseper; Piers Aggett; Thomas Wesley Pentz; Kesi Dryden	Toast to Our Differences	2018	
"Listen to Soul, Listen to Blues" (Note: Safia cover) †	Anne-Marie	Ben Woolner-Kirkham; Michael Bell	Triple J: Like A Version 12	2016	
"Little Bit of Fun"	KSI featuring Anne-Marie	Abby-Lynn Keen; Adrian Louis Richard McLeod; Anne-Marie Nicholson; Olajide Olatunji; Thomas Mackenzie Bell	All Over the Place (Deluxe)	2021	
"Love Ain't Just a Word"	Rudimental featuring Dizzee Rascal and Anne-Marie	Amir Amor; Anne-Marie Nicholson; Dylan Mills; Jess Jackson; Leon Rolle; Piers Aggett; Thomas Jules; Kesi Dryden	We the Generation	2015	
"Lover Like Me"	CL	Anne-Marie Nicholson; Lee Chae-rin; Freedo; Chloe Tighe; Nafla; Sarah Blanchard	Alpha	2021	
"Luv?"	Aitch featuring Anne-Marie	Andrew Jackson; Andrew Murray; Anne-Marie Nicholson; Grace Barker; Harrison Armstrong; James Murray; Mustafa Omer; Phil Plested	4	2025	
"Machine"	Anne-Marie	Teddy Geiger; Ilsey Juber; Anne-Marie Nicholson	Speak Your Mind	2018	
"Merry Xmas Everybody" (Note: Slade cover) †	Anne-Marie	James Lea; Neville Holder	Non-album song	2025	
"Never Loved Anyone Before"	Anne-Marie	Anne-Marie Nicholson; Evan Blair; Nami Ondas; Taylor Upsahl	Unhealthy	2023	
"Obsessed"	Anne-Marie	Anne-Marie Nicholson; Evan Blair; Lionel Bart; Madi Yanofsky; Nami Ondas	Unhealthy	2023	
"Our Song"	Anne-Marie and Niall Horan	Anne-Marie Nicholson; Ben Kohn; Niall Horan; Phil Plested; Tom Barnes	Therapy	2021	
"Peaches" #	Diljit Dosanjh and Intense featuring Anne-Marie	Anne-Marie Nicholson; Raj Ranjodh	Non-album song	2022	
"Peak (Stripped)"	Anne-Marie	Anne-Marie Nicholson; Bradford Ellis; Laura Dockrill	Speak Your Mind (Deluxe)	2016	
"Perfect"	Anne-Marie	Anne-Marie Nicholson; Jennifer Decilveo; Levi Lennox	Speak Your Mind	2018	
"Problems"	Anne-Marie	Anne-Marie Nicholson; Jennifer Decilveo	Non-album song	2020	
"Psycho"	Anne-Marie and Aitch	Harrison Armstrong; Anne-Marie Nicholson; Grace Barker; Henry Tucker; Samuel Brennan; Tom Hollings; Tom Mann	Unhealthy	2022	
"Remember I Told You"	Nick Jonas featuring Anne-Marie and Mike Posner	Jordan Johnson; Marcus Lomax; Mike Posner; Nick Jonas; Oliver Peterhof; Stefan Johnson	Non-album song	2017	
"Rewrite the Stars" (Note: Zac Efron and Zendaya cover) †	James Arthur and Anne-Marie	Benj Pasek; Justin Paul	The Greatest Showman: Reimagined	2018	
"Rockabye"	Clean Bandit featuring Sean Paul and Anne-Marie	Ammar Malik; Ina Wroldsen; Jack Patterson; Sean Henriques; Steve Mac	Speak Your Mind (Deluxe) (Note: "Rockabye" also appears on Clean Bandit's album What is Love?)	2016	
"Rumour Mill"	Rudimental featuring Will Heard and Anne-Marie	Amir Amor; Jess Glynne; Leon Rolle; Piers Aggett; Uzoechi Emenike; Will Heard; Kesi Dryden	We the Generation	2015	
"Sad Bitch"	Anne-Marie	Anne-Marie Nicholson; Evan Blair; Nami Ondas; Samuel Brennan; Taylor Upsahl; Tom Hollings	Unhealthy	2023	
"Scientist"	Twice	72; Anne-Marie Nicholson; Melanie Fontana; Michel Shulz; Steven Franks; Tommy Brown	Formula of Love: O+T=＜3	2021	
"Should've Known Better"	Clean Bandit featuring Anne-Marie	Anne-Marie Nicholson; Jack Patterson; Sam Roman	What is Love?	2018	
"Some People"	Anne-Marie	Anne-Marie Nicholson; Fred Ball; Jennifer Decilveo	Speak Your Mind (Deluxe)	2018	
"So Sorry"	Rudimental featuring Skream	Amir Amor; Anne-Marie Nicholson; Leon Rolle; Oliver Dene Jones; Piers Aggett; Kesi Dryden	Ground Control	2021	
"Stole"	Anne-Marie	Anne-Marie Nicholson; Josh Record; Laura Dockrill	Karate	2015	
"Sucks to Be You"	Anne-Marie	Anne-Marie Nicholson; Connor Blake; James Murray; Mustafa Omer; Sara Boe	Unhealthy	2023	
"Tell Your Girlfriend"	Anne-Marie	Anne-Marie Nicholson; Blake Slatkin; Brittany Amaradio	Therapy	2021	
"That's What You Get"	Anne-Marie	Anne-Marie Nicholson; Connor Blake; James Murray; Mustafa Omer; Sara Boe	If You're Looking for a Reason to Key Your Ex's Car	2025	
"Then"	Anne-Marie	Anne-Marie Nicholson; Ina Wroldsen; Steve Mac	Speak Your Mind	2017	
"Therapy"	Anne-Marie	Anne-Marie Nicholson; Ben Kohn; Phil Plested; Peter Kelleher; Thomas Barnes	Therapy	2021	
"Think of Christmas"	Anne-Marie	Daniel Cream; Eren Cannata; Justin Tranter; Kennedi Lykken	Happiest Season (Music from and Inspired by the Film)	2020	
"This City Remix" #	Sam Fischer featuring Anne-Marie	Anne-Marie Nicholson; Jackson Morgan; James Robbins; Jennifer Decilveo; Sam Fischer	Non-album song	2020	
"Times Like These" (Note: Foo Fighters cover) †	Live Lounge Allstars (Note: Composed of Anne-Marie, Dua Lipa, Grace Carter, Celeste, Paloma Faith, Sam Fender, Jess Glynne, Ellie Goulding, Dave Grohl, Taylor Hawkins, Luke Hemmings, James Johnston, Ben Johnston, Dermot Kennedy, Mike Kerr, Zara Larsson, Mabel, Rag'n'Bone Man, Chris Martin, Simon Neil, Rita Ora, Sean Paul, Sigrid, Dan Smith, Fraser T. Smith, Hailee Steinfeld, Ben Thatcher, AJ Tracey, Chris Wood, Yungblud)	Dave Grohl; Taylor Hawkins; Nate Mendel; Chris Shiflett	Non-album song	2020	
"To Be Young"	Anne-Marie featuring Doja Cat	Amala Dlamini; Anne-Marie Nicholson; Billy Walsh; Brittany Amaradio; Louis Bell; Teo Halm	Therapy (Japanese edition)	2020	
"Trainwreck"	Anne-Marie	Anne-Marie Nicholson; Camille Purcell; Phil Plested; Sam Brennan; Tom Hollings	Unhealthy	2023	
"Trigger"	Anne-Marie	Chris Loco; Emily Warren; Scott Harris	Speak Your Mind	2018	
"Try Me Out"	Gorgon City featuring Anne-Marie	Anne-Marie Nicholson; James Newman; Jonny Coffer; Kye Gibbon; Matthew Robson-Scott	Sirens (Deluxe)	2014	
"Unhealthy"	Anne-Marie featuring Shania Twain	Anne-Marie Nicholson; Castle; Riley McDonough; Connor McDonough	Unhealthy	2023	
"Unlovable"	Anne-Marie featuring Rudimental	Anne-Marie Nicholson; Camille Purcell; Nathan Dawe; Tre Jean-Marie; Uzoechi Emenike	Therapy	2021	
"Used to Love You"	Anne-Marie	Anne-Marie Nicholson; Fraser T. Smith	Speak Your Mind (Deluxe)	2018	
"Way Too Long"	Nathan Dawe, Anne-Marie and MoStack	Anne-Marie Nicholson; Daniel Traynor; Dayo Olatunji; Montell Daley; Ryan Ashley; Sire Noah; Tre Jean-Marie; Uzoechi Emenike	Therapy	2021	
"We Got Love"	Sigala featuring Ella Henderson	Anne-Marie Nicholson; Derrick May; Gabriella Henderson; Janée Bennett; Joakim Jarl; Michael James; Nick Gale; Bruce Fielder; Thomas Jules	Everything I Didn't Say and More	2019	
"Who I Am"	Anne-Marie	Alex Niceforo; Keith Sorrells; Sean Douglas; Warren Felder	Therapy	2021	
"_World" #	Seventeen and Anne-Marie	Anne-Marie Nicholson; Bumzu; Melanie Fontana; Michel Shulz; Steven Franks; Tommy Brown; Vernon; Woozi	Non-album song	2022	
"x2"	Anne-Marie	Anne-Marie Nicholson; Fred Ball; Peter Rycroft; Rachel Keen	Therapy	2021	
"You & I"	Anne-Marie featuring Khalid	Anne-Marie Nicholson; Christopher Smith; James Murray; Camille Purcell; Khalid Robinson; Mustafa Omer	Unhealthy	2023	
"You Need My Love"	Chloe Martini featuring Anne-Marie	Chloe Martini; Anne-Marie Nicholson	Never Twice the Same	2017	
