= Anne-Marie discography =

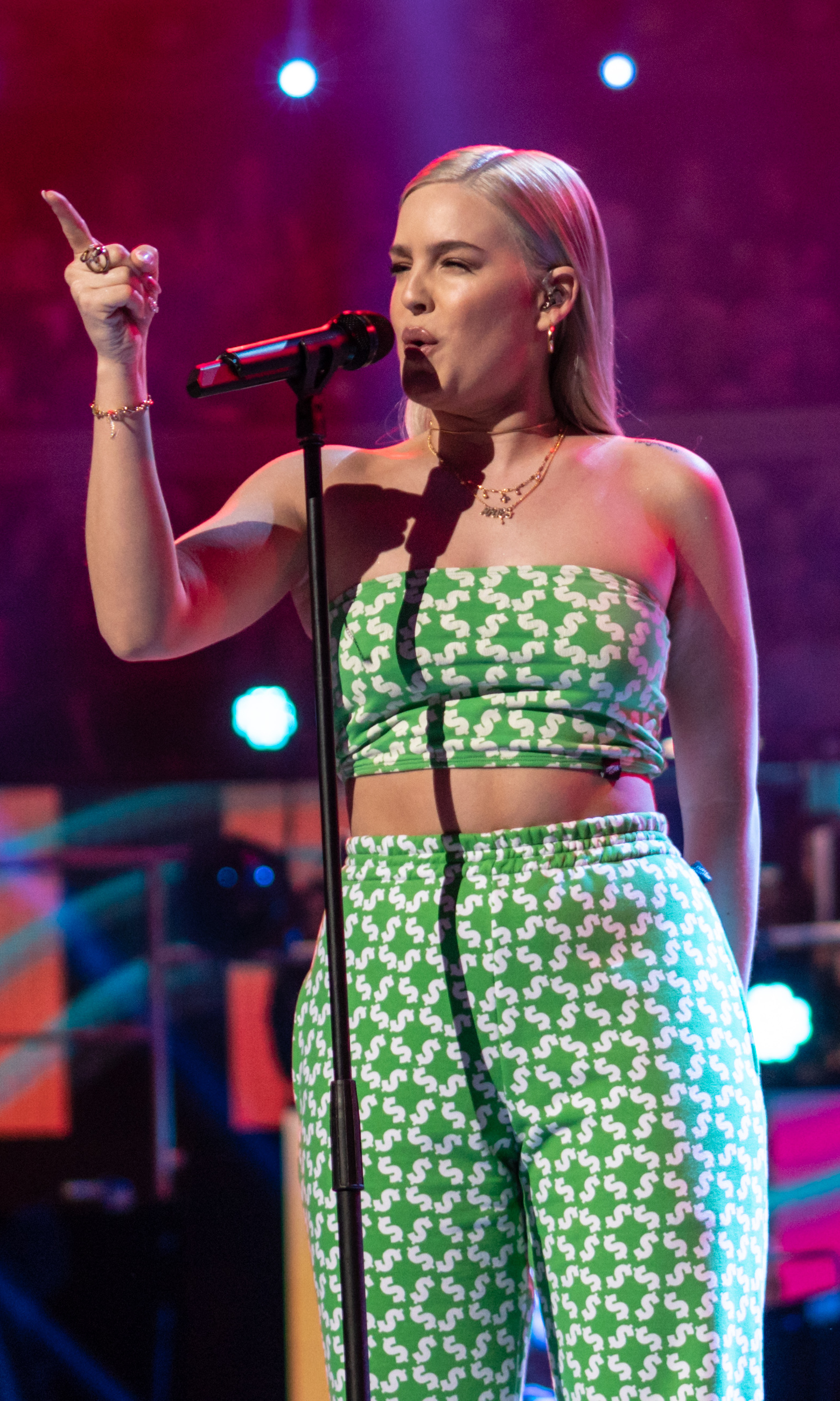
- Anne-Marie performing at The Queen's Birthday Party in 2018
- Studio albums: 3
- EPs: 7
- Singles: 44
- Promotional singles: 4

The discography of British singer Anne-Marie consists of three studio albums, seven extended plays, forty-four singles (including thirteen as a featured artist), and four promotional singles. She has attained several charting singles on the UK Singles Chart, including Clean Bandit's "Rockabye", featuring Sean Paul, which peaked at number one, as well as "Alarm", "Ciao Adios", "Friends" and "2002". Her debut studio album, Speak Your Mind, was released on 27 April 2018 and peaked at number three on the UK Albums Chart, and was certified Platinum there as well as Gold in Italy, double Platinum in Canada and Platinum in US. Anne-Marie has sold an average of 40 million records worldwide with over 37 million certified sales.

Anne-Marie's second studio album, Therapy, was released on 23 July 2021. The album was supported by four singles, "Don't Play", "Way Too Long", "Our Song" and "Kiss My (Uh-Oh)", of which two reached the top 10 on the UK Singles Chart. The album peaked at number 2 in the UK and has since been certified Gold by the British Phonographic Industry (BPI).

On 28 July 2023, Anne-Marie released her third studio album Unhealthy. The album was preceded by three singles, including "Psycho" and "Unhealthy" which reached number 5 and 18 on the UK Singles Chart, respectively. The album peaked at number 2 in the UK and at number 1 in Scotland. It has been certified Silver by the British Phonographic Industry.

In 2025, Anne-Marie released two extended plays, If You're Looking for a New Best Friend and If You're Looking for a Reason to Key Your Ex's Car, along with the single "Depressed", which peaked at number 41 on the UK Singles Chart.

== Albums ==
=== Studio albums ===
Title	Details	Peak chart positions										Certifications
Title	Details	UK	AUS	AUT	GER	IRE	NLD	NZ	SCO	SWI	US	Certifications
Speak Your Mind	Release date: 27 April 2018; Label: Major Tom's, Asylum; Format: CD, LP, digital download, streaming	3	18	14	24	4	17	31	3	10	31	BPI: Platinum; IFPI AUT: Gold; MC: 2× Platinum; NVPI: Gold; RIAA: Platinum; RMNZ: 3× Platinum
Therapy	Release date: 23 July 2021; Label: Major Tom's, Asylum; Format: CD, LP, cassette, digital download, streaming	2	60	15	22	4	19	36	2	36	—	BPI: Gold
Unhealthy	Release date: 28 July 2023; Label: Major Tom's, Asylum; Format: CD, LP, cassette, digital download, streaming	2	—	—	—	11	—	—	1	—	—	BPI: Silver
"—" denotes a recording that did not chart or was not released in that territory.

== Extended plays ==
Title	Details
Karate	Release date: 10 July 2015; Label: Major Tom's, Asylum; Format: digital download, streaming
Deezer Next Live Session	Release date: 15 September 2017; Label: Major Tom's, Asylum; Format: streaming
Spotify Singles	Release date: 30 May 2018; Label: Major Tom's, Asylum; Format: streaming
Deezer Sessions	Release date: 28 November 2018; Label: Major Tom's, Asylum; Format: streaming
Apple Music Home Session: Anne-Marie	Release date: 25 August 2023; Label: Major Tom's, Asylum; Format: digital download, streaming
If You're Looking for a New Best Friend	Release date: 14 February 2025; Label: Major Tom's, Asylum; Format: digital download, streaming
If You're Looking for a Reason to Key Your Ex's Car	Release date: 11 April 2025; Label: Major Tom's, Asylum; Format: digital download, streaming

== Singles ==
=== As lead artist ===
List of singles as lead artist, with selected chart positions and certifications, showing year released and album name
Title	Year	Peak chart positions										Certifications	Album
Title	Year	UK	AUS	AUT	CAN	GER	IRE	ITA	SWE	SWI	US	Certifications	Album
"Karate"	2015	—	—	—	—	—	—	—	—	—	—		Karate
"Gemini"	2015	—	—	—	—	—	—	—	—	—	—		Karate
"Boy"	2015	—	—	—	—	—	—	—	—	—	—		Non-album singles
"Do It Right"	2015	90	22	—	—	—	—	—	—	—	—	ARIA: Platinum	Non-album singles
"Alarm"	2016	16	7	26	97	27	23	36	57	62	— (Note: "Alarm" did not enter the Billboard Hot 100, but peaked at number 3 on the Bubbling Under Hot 100 Singles chart.)	BPI: 2× Platinum; ARIA: 2× Platinum; BVMI: Gold; FIMI: Platinum; MC: Platinum; RIAA: Gold	Speak Your Mind
"Ciao Adios"	2017	9	80	65	—	23	13	—	—	64	—	BPI: 2× Platinum; ARIA: Platinum; BVMI: Platinum; FIMI: Gold; IFPI SWI: Gold; MC: Gold	Speak Your Mind
"Either Way" (with Snakehips featuring Joey Badass)	2017	47	64	—	—	—	—	—	—	—	—	BPI: Silver	Non-album single
"Heavy"	2017	37	—	—	—	—	51	—	—	—	—	BPI: Silver	Speak Your Mind
"Then"	2017	87	—	—	—	—	—	—	—	—	—	BPI: Silver	Speak Your Mind
"Friends" (with Marshmello)	2018	4	4	1	5	1	3	23	5	4	11	BPI: 3× Platinum; ARIA: 4× Platinum; BVMI: Platinum; FIMI: Platinum; IFPI AUT: Gold; IFPI SWI: Platinum; MC: 7× Platinum; RIAA: 4× Platinum	Speak Your Mind
"2002"	2018	3	4	9	49	18	2	—	30	18	— (Note: "2002" did not enter the Billboard Hot 100, but peaked at number 4 on the Bubbling Under Hot 100 Singles chart.)	BPI: 4× Platinum; ARIA: 8× Platinum; BVMI: Platinum; FIMI: Gold; IFPI AUT: 2× Platinum; IFPI SWI: Platinum; MC: 5× Platinum; RIAA: 2× Platinum	Speak Your Mind
"Perfect to Me"	2018	41	—	—	—	—	34	—	—	—	—	BPI: Gold	Speak Your Mind
"Rewrite the Stars" (with James Arthur)	2018	7	67	—	—	100	12	—	27	44	— (Note: "Rewrite the Stars" did not enter the Billboard Hot 100, but peaked at number twenty-four on the Bubbling Under Hot 100 Singles chart.)	BPI: 2× Platinum; FIMI: Gold; RIAA: Gold	The Greatest Showman: Reimagined
"Birthday" (Note: "Birthday" and "To Be Young" only appeared on the Japanese edition of Therapy.)	2020	31	77	—	—	—	40	—	— (Note: "Birthday" did not enter the Swedish Singellista Chart, but peaked at number one on the Swedish Heatseeker Chart.)	—	—	BPI: Gold	Therapy
"Her"	2020	— (Note: "Her" did not enter the UK Singles Chart, but peaked at number 24 on the UK Singles Downloads Chart.)	—	—	—	—	—	—	—	—	—		Non-album single
"To Be Young" (featuring Doja Cat)	2020	74	—	—	—	—	73	—	—	—	—		Therapy
"Problems"	2020	—	—	—	—	—	—	—	—	—	—		Non-album single
"Don't Play" (with KSI and Digital Farm Animals) (Note: "Don't Play" is also included on KSI's second studio album All Over the Place.)	2021	2	—	—	—	—	9	—	— (Note: "Don't Play" did not enter the Swedish Singellista Chart, but peaked at number 18 on the Swedish Heatseeker Chart.)	—	— (Note: "Don't Play" did not enter the Billboard Hot 100, but peaked at number twelve on the Hot Dance/Electronic Songs chart.)	BPI: Platinum	Therapy
"Way Too Long" (with Nathan Dawe and MoStack)	2021	37	—	—	—	—	37	—	—	—	—	BPI: Silver	Therapy
"Our Song" (with Niall Horan)	2021	13	51	—	— (Note: "Our Song" did not enter the Billboard Canada Hot 100, but peaked at number 28 on the Canada Digital Song Sales Singles chart.)	—	7	—	— (Note: "Our Song" did not enter the Swedish Singellista Chart, but peaked at number six on the Swedish Heatseeker Chart.)	—	—	BPI: Platinum; MC: Platinum	Therapy
"Kiss My (Uh-Oh)" (with Little Mix)	2021	10	—	—	—	—	13	—	—	—	—	BPI: Platinum	Therapy
"Everywhere" (with Niall Horan)	2021	23	—	—	—	—	49	—	—	—	—		Non-album singles
"I Just Called" (with Neiked and Latto)	2022	99	—	—	—	—	—	—	— (Note: "I Just Called" did not enter the Swedish Singellista Chart, but peaked at number three on the Swedish Heatseeker Chart.)	—	—		Non-album singles
"Psycho" (with Aitch)	2022	5	—	—	—	—	8	—	— (Note: "Psycho" did not enter the Swedish Singellista Chart, but peaked at number one on the Swedish Heatseeker Chart.)	—	—	BPI: Platinum	Unhealthy
"Sad Bitch"	2023	65	—	—	—	—	—	—	—	—	—		Unhealthy
"Expectations" (with Minnie from (G)I-dle) (Note: "Expectations" only appears on the deluxe edition of Anne-Marie's third studio album Unhealthy.)	2023	—	—	—	—	—	—	—	—	—	—		Unhealthy
"Baby Don't Hurt Me" (with David Guetta and Coi Leray) (Note: "Baby Don't Hurt Me" only appears on the "Super Unhealthy" edition of Anne-Marie's third studio album Unhealthy.)	2023	13	67	13	15	9	10	30	36	6	48	BPI: Platinum; ARIA: Platinum; BVMI: Platinum; FIMI: 2× Platinum; IFPI AUT: Platinum; IFPI SWI: 3× Platinum; MC: 2× Platinum	Unhealthy
"Unhealthy" (featuring Shania Twain)	2023	18	—	—	—	—	10	—	—	—	—	BPI: Platinum	Unhealthy
"Coming Your Way" (with Michaël Brun and Becky G)	2023	—	—	—	—	—	—	—	—	—	— (Note: "Coming Your Way" did not enter the Billboard Hot 100, but peaked at number forty-nine on the Hot Dance/Electronic Songs chart.)		Fami Vol. 1
"Cry Baby" (with Clean Bandit and David Guetta)	2024	49	—	—	—	—	—	—	95	—	— (Note: "Cry Baby" did not enter the Billboard Hot 100, but peaked at number forty on the Hot Dance/Electronic Songs chart.)	BPI: Silver	Non-album single
"Depressed"	2025	41	—	—	—	—	—	—	—	—	—		Non-album single
"—" denotes a recording that did not chart or was not released in that territory.

=== As featured artist ===
List of singles as featured artist, with selected chart positions and certifications, showing year released and album name
Title	Year	Peak chart positions										Certifications	Album
Title	Year	UK	AUS	AUT	CAN	GER	IRE	ITA	SWE	SWI	US	Certifications	Album
"Rumour Mill" (Rudimental featuring Anne-Marie and Will Heard)	2015	67	68	—	—	—	—	—	—	—	—	BPI: Silver	We the Generation
"Alright with Me" (Wretch 32 featuring Anne-Marie and PRGRSHN)	2015	— (Note: "Alright With Me" did not enter the UK Singles Chart, but peaked at number 22 on the UK Independent Singles Chart.)	—	—	—	—	—	—	—	—	—		Non-album single
"Catch 22" (Illy featuring Anne-Marie)	2016	—	11	—	—	—	—	—	—	—	—	ARIA: 3× Platinum	Two Degrees
"Rockabye" (Note: "Rockabye" is also included on the deluxe edition of Anne-Marie's debut studio album Speak Your Mind.) (Clean Bandit featuring Sean Paul and Anne-Marie)	2016	1	1	1	4	1	1	1	1	1	9	BPI: 4× Platinum; ARIA: 5× Platinum; BVMI: 2× Platinum; FIMI: 7× Platinum; IFPI AUT: Platinum; IFPI SWI: 2× Platinum; MC: 9× Platinum; RIAA: 3× Platinum	What Is Love?
"Remember I Told You" (Nick Jonas featuring Anne-Marie and Mike Posner)	2017	97	89	—	96	—	—	—	92	—	—		Non-album singles
"Bridge over Troubled Water" (as part of Artists for Grenfell)	2017	1	53	32	—	—	25	—	—	28	—	BPI: Gold	Non-album singles
"Besándote" (Remix) (Piso 21 featuring Anne-Marie)	2017	—	—	—	—	—	—	—	—	—	—		Non-album singles
"Let Me Live" (Rudimental and Major Lazer featuring Anne-Marie and Mr Eazi)	2018	42	77	—	—	—	43	—	— (Note: "Let Me Live" did not enter the Swedish Singellista Chart, but peaked at number six on the Swedish Heatseeker Chart.)	99	— (Note: "Let Me Live" did not enter the Billboard Hot 100, but peaked at number twenty on the Hot Dance/Electronic Songs chart.)	BPI: Silver; ARIA: Gold	Toast to Our Differences
"Don't Leave Me Alone" (Note: "Don't Leave Me Alone" is also included on the deluxe edition of Anne-Marie's debut studio album Speak Your Mind.) (David Guetta featuring Anne-Marie)	2018	18	43	26	66	32	16	67	25	43	— (Note: "Don't Leave Me Alone" did not enter the Billboard Hot 100, but peaked at number 21 on the Bubbling Under Hot 100 chart.)	BPI: Gold; ARIA: Platinum; FIMI: Gold; MC: Platinum; RIAA: Gold	7
"Fuck, I'm Lonely" (Lauv featuring Anne-Marie)	2019	32	19	48	70	80	15	—	49	53	— (Note: "Fuck, I'm Lonely" did not enter the Billboard Hot 100, but peaked at number eight on the Bubbling Under Hot 100 chart.)	BPI: Gold; ARIA: 2× Platinum; RIAA: Gold	13 Reasons Why: Season 3 and How I'm Feeling
"Times Like These" (as part of Live Lounge Allstars)	2020	1	—	—	—	—	—	—	—	—	—	BPI: Silver	Non-album single
"Come Over" (Rudimental featuring Anne-Marie and Tion Wayne)	2020	26	—	—	—	—	—	—	—	—	—	BPI: Gold	Ground Control
"Peaches" (Diljit Dosanjh featuring Anne-Marie)	2022	—	—	—	—	—	—	—	—	—	—	MC: Gold	Drive Thru
"Luv?" (Aitch featuring Anne-Marie)	2025	— (Note: "Luv?" did not enter the UK Singles Chart, but peaked at number 47 on the UK Independent Singles Chart.)	—	—	—	—	—	—	—	—	—		4
"—" denotes a recording that did not chart or was not released in that territory.

=== Promotional singles ===
Title	Year	Album
"Peak" (Note: The stripped version of "Peak" later became the main version of the song.)	2016	Speak Your Mind
"Think of Christmas"	2020	Happiest Season (Music from and Inspired by the Film)
"Beautiful"	2021	Therapy
"Trainwreck"	2023	Unhealthy
"Christmas Without You"	2023	Your Christmas or Mine 2 (Original Motion Picture Soundtrack)
"The Idea of You" (with Nicholas Galitzine)	2024	The Idea of You

== Other charted songs ==
Title	Year	Peak chart positions		Album
Title	Year	UK	IRE	Album
"Trigger"	2018	—	59	Speak Your Mind
"You & I" (featuring Khalid)	2023	— (Note: "You & I" did not enter the UK Singles Chart, but peaked at number 70 on the UK Singles Downloads Chart.)	—	Unhealthy
"Merry Xmas Everybody" (Slade cover)	2025	— (Note: "Merry Xmas Everybody" did not enter the UK Singles Chart, but peaked at number 72 on the UK Singles Downloads Chart.)	—	Non-album single
"—" denotes a recording that did not chart or was not released in that territory.

== Guest appearances ==
Title	Year	Album
"Elevate" (Gorgon City featuring Anne-Marie)	2014	Sirens
"Try Me Out" (Gorgon City featuring Anne-Marie)	2014	Sirens
"Love Ain't Just a Word" (Rudimental featuring Anne-Marie and Dizzee Rascal)	2015	We the Generation
"Foreign World" (Rudimental featuring Anne-Marie)	2015	We the Generation
"All That Love" (Rudimental featuring Anne-Marie)	2015	We the Generation
"You Need My Love" (Chloe Martini featuring Anne-Marie)	2017	Never Twice the Same
"Should've Known Better" (Clean Bandit featuring Anne-Marie)	2018	What Is Love?
"Bedroom" (JJ Lin featuring Anne-Marie)	2021	Like You Do
"Little Bit of Fun" (KSI featuring Anne-Marie)	2021	All Over the Place (Deluxe Edition)

== Music videos ==
List of music videos, showing year released and directors
Title	Year	Director(s)	Ref.
As lead artist
"Karate"	2015	Scratch	
"Gemini"	2015	—N/a	
"Boy"	2015	Courtney Phillips	
"Do It Right"	2016	Selina Miles	
"Alarm"	2016	Malia James	
"Ciao Adios"	2017	Basak Erol	
"Either Way" (with Snakehips featuring Joey Badass)	2017	Hector Dockrill	
"Heavy"	2017	Malia James	
"Friends" (with Marshmello)	2018	Hannah Lux Davis	
"Friends" (Alternative Music Video)	2018	Daniel Malikyar	
"2002"	2018	Hannah Lux Davis	
"Perfect To Me"	2018	Hannah Lux Davis	
"Rewrite the Stars" (with James Arthur)	2018	Hannah Lux Davis	
"Birthday"	2020	Hannah Lux Davis	
"To Be Young" (featuring Doja Cat)	2020	Hannah Lux Davis	
"Don't Play" (with KSI and Digital Farm Animals)	2021	Troy Roscoe	
"Way Too Long" (with Nathan Dawe and Mostack)	2021	Troy Roscoe	
"Our Song" (with Niall Horan)	2021	Michael Holyk	
"Kiss My (Uh-Oh)" (with Little Mix)	2021	Hannah Lux Davis	
"Beautiful"	2021	Hassan Akkad	
"Psycho" (with Aitch)	2022	Samuel Douek	
"Sad Bitch"	2023	—N/a	
"Expectations" (with Minnie)	2023	—N/a	
"Baby Don't Hurt Me" (with David Guetta and Coi Leray)	2023	Hannah Lux Davis	
"Unhealthy" (with Shania Twain)	2023	Olivia Rose	
"Coming Your Way" (with Michaël Brun and Becky G)	2023	Andrea Saaverda	
"Cry Baby" (with Clean Bandit and David Guetta)	2024	Clean Bandit	
"Don't Panic"	2025	Jocelyn Anquetil	
"I Don't Like Your Boyfriend"	2025	Jocelyn Anquetil	
"That's What You Get"	2025	—N/a	
"Depressed"	2025	Benji Gershon	
As featured artist
"Rumour Mill" (Rudimental featuring Anne-Marie and Will Heard)	2015	I Owe Youth	
"Alright With Me" (Wretch 32 featuring Anne-Marie and PRGRSHN)	2015	Max Giwa & Dania Pasquini	
"Catch 22" (Illy featuring Anne-Marie)	2016	Mark Staubach	
"Rockabye" (Clean Bandit featuring Anne-Marie and Sean Paul)	2016	Grace Chatto & Jack Patterson	
"Remember I Told You" (Nick Jonas featuring Anne-Marie and Mike Posner)	2017	Issac Rentz	
"Let Me Live" (Rudimental and Major Lazer featuring Anne-Marie and Mr Eazi)	2018	Chris Saunders	
"Don't Leave Me Alone" (David Guetta featuring Anne-Marie)	2018	Hannah Lux Davis	
"Fuck, I'm Lonely" (Lauv featuring Anne-Marie)	2019	Jenna Marsh	
"Luv?" (Aitch featuring Anne-Marie)	2025	Gabriella Kingsley	

== Songwriting credits ==
Title	Year	Artist	Album	Co-written with
"Colour" (featuring Hailee Steinfeld)	2018	MNEK	Language	Uzoechi Emenike, Raoul Chen, Arthur Hamilton
"We Got Love" (featuring Ella Henderson)	2019	Sigala	Non-album singles	Bruce Fielder, Joakim Jarl, Thomas Jules, Derrick May, Michael James, Nicholas Gale, Gabriella Henderson, Janee Bennett
"I Love Me"	2020	Demi Lovato	Non-album singles	Demetria Lovato, Jennifer Decilveo, Alex Niceforo, Keith Sorrells, Sean Douglas, Warren Felder
"Alien"	2020	Morgan	Alien	Ellis Taylor, Thomas Jules, Morgan Connie Smith
"Distance"	2021	Becky Hill	Only Honest On The Weekend	Adam Argyle, Matthew Coleman, Rebecca Hill, Tom Jules
"So Sorry" (Note: Anne-Marie also contributes uncredited vocals on "So Sorry".)	2021	Rudimental, Skream	Ground Control	Amir Amor, Kesi Dryden, Leon Rolle, Piers Aggett, Oliver Dene Jones
"C'est Fini" (featuring Rv & Lowkey)	2021	Rudimental	Ground Control	Amir Amor, Kesi Dryden, Leon Rolle, Piers Aggett, Conor Bellis, Esta Dean, George Conway, Jordan Townsend, Kareem Dennis, Matthew Kopp, Sam Knowles
"Lover Like Me"	2021	CL	Alpha	Lee Chae-rin, Freedo, Nafla, Cleo Tighe, Sarah Blanchard
"Scientist"	2021	Twice	Formula of Love: O+T=＜3	Melanie Fontana, Steven Frank, Tommy Brown, Michael "Lindgren" Shulz, 72
"Eenie Meenie"(featuring Hongjoong)	2024	Chungha	Non-album single	Conor Blake, Sara Boe, Tom Hollings, Sam Brennan, Hongjoong Kim, Cho Yun Kyoung, Kim Chan-mi
