= Speak Your Mind =

2018 studio album by Anne-Marie

Studio album by Anne-Marie
- Released: 27 April 2018
- Recorded: 2015–2018
- Studio: Various (see below)
- Genres: Pop; EDM
- Length: 41:11
- Labels: Major Tom's; Asylum; Atlantic
- Producers: Jennifer Decilveo; Nick Monson; Tom Meredith; MdL; Amir Amor; Chris Loco; Moon Willis; Levi Lennox; Marshmello; The Invisible Men; Nana Rogues; Jonathan White; Team Salut; MNEK; TMS; Sam Klempner; Teddy Geiger; Zach Nicita; Fred Ball; Fraser T Smith; Lostboy; Jack Patterson; Mark Ralph; David Guetta; Lotus IV; Brunelle; Steve Mac

Anne-Marie chronology
Karate (2015)	Speak Your Mind (2018)	Therapy (2021)

Singles from Speak Your Mind
- 1. "Alarm" Released: 20 May 2016; 2. "Ciao Adios" Released: 10 February 2017; 3. "Heavy" Released: 22 September 2017; 4. "Then" Released: 15 December 2017; 5. "Friends" Released: 9 February 2018; 6. "2002" Released: 20 April 2018; 7. "Perfect to Me" Released: 2 November 2018

Speak Your Mind is the debut studio album by English singer Anne-Marie, released on 27 April 2018, through Major Tom's, Asylum Records, and Atlantic Records. Anne-Marie announced the album, a pop and EDM record, on February 21, 2018, and it was made available for pre-order two days later. The album was recorded from 2015 to 2018 at various studios, and the production was handled by Jennifer Decilveo, Nick Monson, Amir Amor, Chris Loco, Marshmello, The Invisible Men, MNEK, TMS, Teddy Geiger, Fred Ball, Fraser T. Smith, Jack Patterson of Clean Bandit, Mark Ralph, David Guetta, and Steve Mac, alongside others. Producer Marshmello makes a guest appearance and is the sole guest on the album's standard track listing, although producers Clean Bandit and David Guetta, alongside Sean Paul, appear on the album's various reissues.

The album was supported by seven singles. The lead single, "Alarm", was commercially successful, charting at number 16 on the UK singles chart and number 7 on the ARIA Charts in Australia, where the single was certified 2× Platinum. It would eventually peak at number 3 on the Billboard Bubbling Under Hot 100 Singles chart in the United States. The second single, "Ciao Adios" was more successful in the United Kingdom, peaking at number 9 on the UK singles chart and certifying 2× Platinum. The third and fourth singles, "Heavy" and "Then" were modestly successful in the UK, while the fifth single, "Friends" (featuring Marshmello) was successful worldwide, charting at number 4 on the UK singles chart, while becoming Anne-Marie's first single on the Billboard Hot 100 and topping multiple charts worldwide. The sixth single, "2002" was also commercially successful, becoming Anne-Marie's highest-charting solo single in the UK, while the seventh and final single, "Perfect to Me", a remix of the album track "Perfect", was modestly successful in the UK.

Upon the release of Speak Your Mind, the album received generally favourable reviews from music critics. The album was also a commercial success, peaking at number 3 in both the UK Albums (OCC) chart and the Scottish Albums (OCC) chart. It also peaked at number 4 in the Irish Albums (IRMA) chart and number 31 on the Billboard Hot 100. In the UK, it was certified Platinum by the British Phonographic Industry (BPI) for equivalent sales of 300,000 units in the country. It was also certified Platinum by the Recording Industry Association of America (RIAA) and 2× Platinum by Music Canada (MC). The album would later be reissued with bonus tracks, including the chart-topping Sean Paul–Clean Bandit collaboration "Rockabye", Anne-Marie's most successful hit, and the modestly successful David Guetta collaboration "Don't Leave Me Alone". To promote the album, Anne-Marie went on the Speak Your Mind Tour from 2018 to 2019, featuring supporting acts such as Lennon Stella and Goody Grace.

== Background ==
Talking to Polish pop culture magazine Luvpop about the album's title, Anne-Marie said:

"I just feel like that's what I did on the album. I'm not a shy person anyway, I speak my mind a lot and I am not... I don't hold anything in, I am honest with people and open. And I've just feel that's what I've been like on this album, so it kinda makes sense."

== Singles ==
"Alarm" was released as the lead single from Speak Your Mind on 20 May 2016. The single became Anne-Marie's first major worldwide hit, peaking at No. 16 on the UK Singles Chart. The single additionally reached the top 20 in as Australia and Scotland, as well as the top 40 in seven countries. It was certified Platinum in the UK, Australia, and Poland, and Gold in the US and Canada. The music video for the song, also released on 20 May 2016, was directed by Malia James and filmed in Mexico City. It is loosely inspired by Baz Luhrmann's 1996 film Romeo + Juliet.

"Ciao Adios" was released as the second official single on 10 February 2017. The single became her first top ten hit in the UK, reaching No. 9, while also reaching the top ten in Belgium, Netherlands, Poland, and Scotland. It was also certified 2× Platinum in the UK and the Netherlands, Platinum in Australia, Germany, and Poland, and Gold in Canada. The single had moderate success elsewhere. The "Ciao Adios" music video was released on 9 March 2017 on YouTube and features Anne-Marie with her girl gang dancing in Marrakesh, Morocco, with plenty of colors.

"Heavy" was released on 22 September 2017 as the third single from the record. It failed to replicate the success of "Alarm" and "Ciao Adios", reaching the top 40 in the UK, and only charting in a couple other territories. The music video for "Heavy" was released on 16 October 2017. "Then" was released on 15 December 2017 as the fourth single. The single reached No. 87 in the UK charts and peaked at number 15 on the Tipparade chart in the Netherlands, alongside certifying Silver by the British Phonographic Industry (BPI) for equivalent sales of 200,000 units in the country, alongside "Heavy".

"Friends", a collaboration with American DJ Marshmello, was released as the fifth single on 9 February 2018. It reached the top ten in the UK, Ireland, and Hungary, as well as the top forty in twelve countries. The song additionally became Anne-Marie's first US Billboard Hot 100 entry as a lead artist, where it peaked at number 11. It would eventually be certified 6× Platinum in Canada, 4× Platinum in the US and Australia, and 3× Platinum in the UK. The music video, directed by Hannah Lux Davis, was released on 16 February 2018. In the visual, Anne-Marie and a group of female friends host a house party. Marshmello keeps avoiding being asked to leave. However, as Anne-Marie attempts to kick him out, he keeps finding ways to get back into the house, which annoys Anne-Marie and her friends.

"2002" was released as the sixth single on 20 April 2018. The song debuted at number 8 in the United Kingdom, becoming Anne-Marie's fourth UK top 10 hit, before later climbing to number three, making it Anne-Marie's highest-charting song as a lead artist. It also reached the top ten in Ireland, Scotland, and Australia, and was certified 8× Platinum in the US, 5× Platinum in Canada, 4× Platinum in the UK, and 2× Platinum in Austria and the US. A remixed version of "Perfect" retitled "Perfect to Me" was released as a single on 2 November 2018. It has reached number 57 in the United Kingdom, where it was certified Gold.

=== Promotional singles and other songs ===
On 21 October 2016, a stripped version of the song "Peak" was released. It later became the main version of the song, and was included on Speak Your Mind as the first promotional single. It was specifically included as a bonus track on the Japan edition and digital deluxe edition of the album. Despite not being released as singles, the songs "Can I Get Your Number" and "Trigger" also charted, with the latter peaking at number 59 on the Irish Singles Chart.

== Promotion ==
=== Speak Your Mind Tour ===
Speak Your Mind Tour
- Tour by Anne-Marie
- Location: Europe; Asia; Australia; North America
- Associated album: Speak Your Mind
- Start date: 20 August 2018
- End date: 13 June 2019
- Legs: 5
- No. of shows: 59
- Supporting acts: Goody Grace; Mahalia; Kojey Radical; Ella Watson; Openside; Glades; Lennon Stella

Anne-Marie concert chronology
- Speak Your Mind Tour (2018-2019); Dysfunctional Tour (2022)

In 2018, Anne-Marie announced the Speak Your Mind Tour in support of her debut album. The tour consisted of 5 legs, taking place in Australia, Asia, Europe and North America. The tour began on 20 August 2018, in Los Angeles, and concluded on 19 June 2019, in London. Supporting acts included Goody Grace, Mahalia, Kojey Radical, Ella Watson, Cellarr (then known as "OpenSide"), Glades, and Lennon Stella.

==== Tour dates ====
List of confirmed dates and venues
Date	City	Country	Venue	Supporting act
North America
20 August 2018	Los Angeles	United States	The Roxy Theatre	Goody Grace
24 August 2018	Portland	United States	Holocene	Goody Grace
29 August 2018	Montreal	Canada	Le Ministère	Goody Grace
1 September 2018	Detroit	United States	The Shelter	Goody Grace
10 September 2018	Columbus	United States	A&R Music Bar	Goody Grace
13 September 2018	Boston	United States	Brighton Music Hall	Goody Grace
17 September 2018	New York	United States	Bowery Ballroom	Goody Grace
18 September 2018	Brooklyn	United States	Rough Trade NYC	Goody Grace
24 September 2018	Chicago	United States	Lincoln Hall	Goody Grace
26 September 2018	Washington	United States	U Street Music Hall	Goody Grace
United Kingdom
19 November 2018	Manchester	England	Manchester Academy	Mahalia; Kojey Radical
20 November 2018	Manchester	England	Manchester Academy	Mahalia; Kojey Radical
22 November 2018	London	England	O2 Academy Brixton	Mahalia; Kojey Radical
23 November 2018	London	England	O2 Academy Brixton	Mahalia; Kojey Radical
25 November 2018	Glasgow	Scotland	Barrowland Ballroom	Mahalia
26 November 2018	Glasgow	Scotland	Barrowland Ballroom	Mahalia
28 November 2018	Birmingham	England	O2 Academy	Mahalia; Kojey Radical
29 November 2018	Birmingham	England	O2 Academy	Ella Watson; Kojey Radical
Australia & New Zealand
28 March 2019	Auckland	New Zealand	Spark Arena	Openside
30 March 2019	Brisbane	Australia	Eatons Hill Hotel	Glades
31 March 2019	Sydney	Australia	Enmore Theatre	Glades
2 April 2019	Melbourne	Australia	170 Russell	Glades
3 April 2019	Melbourne	Australia	Prince Bandroom	Glades
4 April 2019	Adelaide	Australia	HQ	Glades
6 April 2019	Perth	Australia	Metro City	Glades
Asia
9 April 2019	Singapore		Capitol Theatre	—N/a
11 April 2019	Hong Kong		MacPherson Stadium	—N/a
13 April 2019	Seoul	South Korea	Yes24 Live Hall	—N/a
15 April 2019	Tokyo	Japan	Liquid Room	—N/a
16 April 2019	Tokyo	Japan	Liquid Room	—N/a
Europe
2 May 2019	Zurich	Switzerland	X-Tra	Lennon Stella
3 May 2019	Munich	Germany	Tonhalle	Lennon Stella
4 May 2019	Vienna	Austria	Gasometer	Lennon Stella
6 May 2019	Berlin	Germany	Tempodrom	Lennon Stella
8 May 2019	Cologne	Germany	Palladium	Lennon Stella
9 May 2019	Luxembourg	Luxembourg	Luxexpo The Box	Lennon Stella
11 May 2019	Hamburg	Germany	Grosse Freiheit	Lennon Stella
13 May 2019	Copenhagen	Denmark	Amager Bio	Lennon Stella
15 May 2019	Antwerp	Belgium	Lotto Arena	Lennon Stella
16 May 2019	Amsterdam	Netherlands	AFAS Live	Lennon Stella
18 May 2019	Paris	France	Le Bataclan	Lennon Stella
19 May 2024	Paris	France	Le Bataclan	Lennon Stella
21 May 2019	Bournemouth	England	O2 Academy	Lennon Stella
23 May 2019	Southend-on-Sea	England	Cliffs Pavilion	Lennon Stella
24 May 2019	Cardiff	Wales	Motorpoint Arena	Lennon Stella
25 May 2019	Leicester	England	De Montfort Hall	Lennon Stella
27 May 2019	Leeds	England	O2 Academy	Lennon Stella
28 May 2019	Sheffield	England	O2 Academy	Lennon Stella
29 May 2019	Edinburgh	Scotland	Usher Hall	Lennon Stella
31 May 2019	Belfast	Northern Ireland	Waterfront Hall	Lennon Stella
1 June 2019	Dublin	Ireland	3Arena	Lennon Stella
3 June 2019	Liverpool	England	Guild of Students	Lennon Stella
4 June 2019	Newcastle	England	O2 Academy	Lennon Stella
6 June 2019	Reading	England	Hexagon	Lennon Stella
7 June 2019	Swindon	England	Oasis	Lennon Stella
8 June 2019	Brighton	England	Dome	Lennon Stella
10 June 2019	Norwich	England	The Nick Rayns LCR, UAE	Lennon Stella
12 June 2019	London	England	Eventim Apollo	Lennon Stella
13 June 2019	London	England	Eventim Apollo	Lennon Stella

==== Setlist ====
This setlist represents the set from the show at O2 Academy in Leeds and may not represent the setlist for the remainder of the tour.

1. "Bad Girlfriend"
2. "Cry"
3. "Do It Right"
4. "Heavy"
5. "Perfect"
6. "Trigger"
7. "Ciao Adios"
8. "Can I Get Your Number "
9. "Don't Leave Me Alone"
10. "Alarm"
11. "Then"
12. "Rockabye"
13. "2002"
14. "Friends"

== Critical reception ==
Professional ratings
Aggregate scores
Source	Rating
AnyDecentMusic?	6.1/10
Metacritic	62/100
Review scores
Source	Rating
AllMusic	3.5/5 stars
Clash	6/10
Evening Standard	3/5 stars
The Guardian	2/5 stars
The Independent	3/5 stars
musicOMH	4/5 stars
NME	3/5 stars
Q	3/5 stars
The Observer	3/5 stars

At Metacritic, which assigns a normalised rating out of 100 to reviews from mainstream critics, Speak Your Mind has an average score of 62 based on eight reviews, indicating "generally favorable reviews".

== Commercial performance ==
=== Anglosphere ===
In the United Kingdom, the album debuted at number 3 on the UK Official Album Chart. It was also certified Platinum by the British Phonographic Industry (BPI) for equivalent sales of 300,000 units. By the end of 2018, the album was positioned at number 26 on the UK Official Album Chart, and by the end of 2019, the album was positioned at number 62 on the chart. In the United States of America, the album charted at number 31 on the Billboard 200, and would later be certified Platinum by the Recording Industry Association of America (RIAA) for equivalent sales of 1,000,000 units in the country. By the end of 2018, the album was positioned at number 182 on the Billboard 200.

In Australia, the album was positioned at number 18 on the ARIA Charts. In Canada, the album charted at number 16 on the Billboard Canadian Albums chart, and was certified 2× Platinum by Music Canada (MC) for equivalent sales of 160,000 units. In New Zealand, the album charted at number 31 on the New Zealand Albums Chart.

=== Europe ===
In Austria, the album charted at number 16 on the Ö3 Austria chart and was certified Gold by IFPI Austria (IFPI AUT) for equivalent sales of 7,500 units in the country. In Belgium, the album charted at number 31 on the Ultratop chart in Wallonia and peaked at number 3 on the same chart in Flanders. By the end of 2018, the album was positioned at number 37 on the Ultratop chart in Flanders, and, by the end of 2019, the album was positioned at number 162 on the same chart. In the Czech Republic, the album charted at number 9 on the Czech Albums Chart. In Finland, the album charted at number 11 on the Official Finnish Charts. In France, the album charted at number 66 on the French Albums Chart and was certified Gold by SNEP for equivalent sales of 50,000 units in the country. By the end of 2018, the album was positioned at number 177 on the French Albums Chart.

In Germany, the album charted at number 24 on the Offizielle Top 100. In Ireland, the album charted at number 4 on the Irish Albums Chart. By the end of 2018, the album was positioned at number 11 on the Irish Albums Chart. By the end of 2019, the album was positioned at number 42 on the chart. In Italy, the album charted at number 78 on the Italian Albums Chart. In the Netherlands, the album charted at number 17 on the Dutch Album Top 100 and was certified Gold by NVPI for equivalent sales of 20,000 units in the country. In Norway, although the album did not chart, it was still certified 3× Platinum by IFPI Norge (IFPI NOR) for equivalent sales of 60,000 units.

In Poland, the album charted at number 40 on the Polish Albums Chart and was certified Gold by the Polish Society of the Phonographic Industry (ZPAV) for equivalent sales of 10,000 units in the country. In Portugal, the album charted at number 50 on the Portuguese Albums Chart. In Slovakia, the album charted at number 9 on the Slovak Albums Chart. In Spain, the album charted at number 27 on the Spanish Albums Chart. In Sweden, the album charted at number 33 on the Sverigetopplistan chart. In Switzerland, the album charted at number 10 on the Swiss Hitparade chart.

=== Other countries ===
In Japan, the album charted at number 185 on the Oricon Album Chart. In Scotland, the album charted at number 3 on the Scottish Albums Chart. In Singapore, although the album did not chart, it was certified Gold by Recording Industry Association Singapore (RIAS) for equivalent sales of 5,000 units. In South Korea, the album charted at number 3 on the Circle Music Chart. By the end of 2018, the album was positioned at number 80 on the chart.

== Reissues ==
The album was first reissued in Japan on the 27th of April, 2018, the same day as the original album's worldwide release. The reissue featured two bonus tracks, included the promotional single "Peak (Stripped)" and "Karate", the title track to Anne-Marie's debut extended play (EP) of the same name. The deluxe edition of the album, released on the same day as the original album, featured four bonus tracks, included the hit single "Rockabye", a collaboration with Clean Bandit and Sean Paul. The digital deluxe edition featured the previous tracks, alongside "Peak" from the Japanese edition and "Rockabye" from the standard deluxe edition. The digital deluxe edition would later be reissued with the David Guetta collaboration "Don't Leave Me Alone".

=== Singles ===
"Rockabye" (Clean Bandit featuring Sean Paul and Anne-Marie) was originally released on the 21st of October, 2016, as the lead single to Clean Bandit's second studio album, What Is Love? (2018). Upon its release, the single topped charts in the United Kingdom, Australia, Austria, Germany, Ireland, Italy, Sweden, and Switzerland, alongside peaking at number 4 on the Canadian Singles Chart and number 9 on the Billboard Hot 100 in the United States. It would additionally be certified 7× Platinum in Canada and Italy, 5× Platinum in Australia, 4× Platinum in the UK, 3× Platinum in the US, and 2× Platinum in Germany and Switzerland.

"Don't Leave Me Alone" (David Guetta featuring Anne-Marie) was originally released on the 27th of July, 2018, as the sixth single to Guetta's seventh studio album, 7 (2018). Upon its release, the single was modestly successful, charting at number 18 on the UK singles chart and making other charts worldwide, with a peak at number 2 on Ultratop's Belgium Dance chart. It was also certified Platinum in Australia, Canada, and Poland.

== Track listing ==
Standard edition
No.	Title	Writer(s)	Producer(s)	Length
1.	"Cry"	Anne-Marie Nicholson; Jennifer Decilveo	Jennifer Decilveo	3:35
2.	"Ciao Adios"	Nicholson; Decilveo; Mason Levy; Tom Meredith	Meredith; MdL	3:19
3.	"Alarm"	Nicholson; Steve Mac; Wayne Hector; Ina Wroldsen	Steve Mac; Amir Amor^{[b]}	3:25
4.	"Trigger"	Scott Harris; Chris Loco; Emily Warren	Loco; Moon Willis^{[b]}	3:13
5.	"Then"	Nicholson; Mac; Wroldsen	Mac	3:34
6.	"Perfect"	Nicholson; Decilveo; Levi Lennox	Decilveo; Lennox	3:53
7.	"Friends" (with Marshmello)	Nicholson; Natalie Dunn; Jasmine Thompson; Richard Boardman; Pablo Bowman; Sarah Blanchard; Eden Anderson; Christopher Comstock	Marshmello	3:22
8.	"Bad Girlfriend"	Nicholson; Paul Blair; Nick Monson; Sasha Sloan; Mark Nilan Jr.	Monson	3:26
9.	"Heavy"	Nicholson; George Astasio; Jason Pebworth; Jonathan Shave; Natasha Phillips; Iain James	The Invisible Men; Nana Rogues; Jonathan White; Team Salut^{[b]}; MNEK^{[b]}	2:52
10.	"2002"	Nicholson; Mac; Edward Sheeran; Julia Michaels; Benjamin Levin	Mac	3:06
11.	"Can I Get Your Number"	Nicholson; Decilveo; Thomas Barnes; Peter Kelleher; Benjamin Kohn	TMS; Sam Klempner^{[b]}	3:20
12.	"Machine"	Teddy Geiger; Ilsey Juber; Nicholson	Geiger; Zach Nicita	4:07
Total length:				41:11

Japan edition (bonus tracks)
No.	Title	Writer(s)	Producer(s)	Length
13.	"Peak" (Stripped)	Nicholson; Ellis; Dockrill	Ellis	3:43
14.	"Karate^{[a]}"	Nicholson; Dockrill; Ellis	Ellis	3:25
Total length:				49:33

Deluxe edition (bonus tracks)
No.	Title	Writer(s)	Producer(s)	Length
13.	"Breathing Fire"	Nicholson; Mac; Wroldsen	Mac	3:54
14.	"Some People"	Nicholson; Decilveo; Fredrik Ball	Ball	3:11
15.	"Used to Love You"	Nicholson; Fraser T Smith	Smith; Lostboy; Manson; Decilveo^{[b]}	4:09
16.	"Rockabye" (Clean Bandit featuring Sean Paul and Anne-Marie)	Jack Patterson; Mac; Wroldsen; Ammar Malik; Sean Paul Henriques	Jack Patterson; Mark Ralph; Mac	4:11

Digital deluxe edition (bonus track)
No.	Title	Writer(s)	Producer(s)	Length
16.	"Peak" (Stripped)	Nicholson; Bradley Ellis; Laura Dockrill		3:46
17.	"Rockabye" (Clean Bandit featuring Sean Paul and Anne-Marie)	Jack Patterson; Mac; Wroldsen; Ammar Malik; Sean Paul Henriques	Jack Patterson; Mark Ralph; Mac	4:11
Total length:				61:22

Digital deluxe edition reissue (bonus track)
No.	Title	Writer(s)	Producer(s)	Length
18.	"Don't Leave Me Alone" (David Guetta featuring Anne-Marie)	David Guetta; Linus Wiklund; Noonie Bao; Sarah Aarons	Guetta; Lotus IV	3:03
Total length:				64:25

=== Notes ===
- ^{^[a]} originally appears on her debut EP Karate
- ^{^[b]} signifies an additional producer
- "2002" contains elements of:
  - "Oops!... I Did It Again" written by Max Martin and Rami Yacoub.
  - "99 Problems" written by Tracy Marrow, Alphonso Henderson and George Clinton Jr.
  - "Bye Bye Bye" written by Andreas Carlsson, Jacob Schulze and Kristian Lundin.
  - "The Next Episode" written by Andre Young, Calvin Broadus, Melvin Bradford, David Axelrod and Brian Bailey.
  - "Ride wit Me" written by William DeBarge, Eldra DeBarge, Etterlene Jordan, Jason Epperson, Lavell Webb and Cornell Haynes.
  - "...Baby One More Time" written by Max Martin.

== Personnel ==
Credits for Speak Your Mind adapted from AllMusic.

=== Studios ===
==== Recording locations ====
- Pineapple Box (Los Angeles) – recording (track 1)
- Rustic Road – vocals recording, guitar, bass, keyboards, synth & drum programming (track 2)
- Miloco's 'The Pool' (London) – vocals recording (track 2)
- Sarm Studios (London) – vocals recording (track 2)
- Rokstone Studios (London) – recording (tracks 3, 5, 10)
- The Garden (London) – recording (track 4)
- SARM Music Village (London) – recording (tracks 4, 7–9)
- Strongroom Studios (London) – recording (track 6)
- Atlantic Records (Los Angeles) – recording (track 8)
- Grove Studios (London) – recording (track 9)
- NPAP Sounds (London) – recording (track 9)
- Straight Forward Music (London) – recording (track 9)
- Major Tom's (London) – recording (track 9)
- The Music Shed (London) – recording (track 11)
- Inspiration Way (Tujunga, California) – recording (track 12)
- Hazelville Road Studios – recording (track 13 (Japanese bonus track))
- 88 Hazelville Road (London) – recording (track 14 (Japanese bonus track))

==== Mixing and mastering locations ====
- The Nest (UK) – mixing (tracks 1, 8, 12)
- Callanwolde Fine Arts Center (Atlanta, Georgia – mixing (tracks 1, 8, 9)
- The Mixsuite UK & LA – mixing (tracks 2–4, 6, 10)
- Metropolis Mastering (London) – mastering (tracks 1–13 (Japanese bonus track))

=== Performers and vocals ===
- Anne-Marie – primary artist, vocals (all tracks)
- Jennifer Decilveo – background vocals (tracks 1, 6, 11), synthesizer (tracks 1, 6, 11), drum programming (tracks 1, 11), keyboards (tracks 1, 6, 11)
- Tom Meredith – guitar, bass, keyboards, synth and drum programming (track 2)
- MdL – guitar, bass, keyboards, synth and drum programming (track 2)
- Chris Laws – drums (tracks 3, 5, 10)
- Amir Amor – drums (track 3)
- Steve Mac – keyboards (tracks 3, 5, 10)
- Paul Gendler – guitars (track 3)
- Thomas Foley – additional drum programming and keyboards (track 3)
- Shane Tremlin – additional drum programming and keyboards (track 3)
- Emily Warren – background vocals (track 4)
- Daniel 'D Rock' Hutchinson – electric guitar (track 4)
- Chris Loco – keyboards, percussion (track 4)
- John Paricelli – guitar (tracks 5, 10)
- Levi Lennox – keyboard (track 6)
- Geo – cello (track 6)
- Nick Monson – keyboards (track 8)
- Mark Nilan – keyboards (track 8)
- Jason Pebworth – keyboards (track 9)
- Jon Shave – keyboards (track 9)
- Nana Rogues – keyboards, bass (track 9)
- Jonathan White – keyboards, guitar, bass (track 9)
- MNEK – keyboards (track 9)
- Team Salut – guitar (track 9)
- Ed Sheeran – guitar (track 10)
- Tom Barnes – drums (track 11)
- Pete Kelleher – keyboard (track 11)
- Ben Kohn – bass and guitar (track 11)
- Teddy Geiger – keys (track 12)
- Zach Nicita – keys (track 12)
- Ilsey Juber – guitars (track 12)
- Brad Ellis – piano, percussion, bass (tracks 13, 14(Japanese bonus)), strings (track 13(Japanese bonus)), synths (track 14(Japanese bonus))

=== Production ===
- Jennifer Decilveo – production (tracks 1, 6)
- Tom Meredith – production, vocal production (track 2)
- MdL – production (track 2)
- Steve Mac – production (tracks 3, 5, 10)
- Amir Amor – additional production (track 3)
- Chris Loco – production (track 4)
- Moon Willis – additional production (track 4)
- Levi Lennox – production (track 6)
- Marshmello – production (track 7)
- Nick Monson – production (track 8)
- The Invisible Men – production (track 9)
- Nana Rogues – production (track 9)
- Jonathan White – production (track 9)
- MNEK – additional production (track 9)
- Team Salut – additional production (track 9)
- Cameron Gower Poole – additional vocal production (track 9)
- TMS – production (track 11)
- Sam Klempner – additional production (track 11)
- Teddy Geiger – production (track 12)
- Zach Nicita – production (track 12)
- Brad Ellis – production (Japanese bonus tracks 13 and 14)

=== Technical ===
- Stuart Hawkes – mastering (tracks 1–13 (Japanese bonus track))
- Geoff Swan – mixing (tracks 1, 8, 12 )
- Jennifer Decilveo – engineering, programming (tracks 1, 6 )
- Phil Tan – mixing (tracks 2–4, 6, 9)
- Bill Zimmerman – assistant engineering (tracks 2–4, 6, 9)
- Tom Meredith – vocal recording (track 2)
- Cameron Gower Poole – additional vocal recording (tracks 2, 9), engineering (tracks 4, 7 and 8)
- Dann Pursey – engineering (tracks 3, 5, 10)
- Chris Laws – engineering (tracks 3, 5, 10), programming (track 3)
- Chris Loco – programming and recording (track 4)
- Mark "Spike" Stent – mixing (tracks 5, 7, 10)
- Micheal Freemen – engineering assistance (tracks 5, 7, 10)
- Marshmello – programming (track 7)
- Benjamin Rice – engineering (track 8)
- Nick Monson – programming (track 8)
- Mark Nilan – programming (track 8)
- MNEK – vocal recording and programming (track 9)
- Jon Shave – programming (track 9)
- George Astasio – programming (track 9)
- Dylan Cooper – programming (track 9)
- Nana Rogues – programming(track 9)
- Jonathan White – programming (track 9)
- Fabian Lenssen – mixing (track 11)
- Chris Bishop – additional vocal engineering (track 11)
- Tom Barnes – programming (track 11)
- Sam Klempner – programming (track 11)
- Teddy Geiger – engineering and programming (track 12)
- Zach Nicita – programming (track 12)
- Brad Ellis – mixing (Japanese bonus tracks 13) and programming (Japanese bonus tracks 14)
- Lexxx – mixing (Japanese bonus tracks 14)
- David Emery – mixing (Japanese bonus tracks 14)

=== Artwork ===
- Michael Furlong – photography
- Sam Nicholson – doodle artwork
- Baby – design

== Charts ==
=== Weekly charts ===
Chart (2018)	Peak position
Australian Albums (ARIA)	18
Austrian Albums (Ö3 Austria)	16
Belgian Albums (Ultratop Flanders)	3
Belgian Albums (Ultratop Wallonia)	31
Canadian Albums (Billboard)	16
Czech Albums (ČNS IFPI)	9
Dutch Albums (Album Top 100)	17
Finnish Albums (Suomen virallinen lista)	11
French Albums (SNEP)	66
German Albums (Offizielle Top 100)	24
Irish Albums (IRMA)	4
Italian Albums (FIMI)	78
Japanese Albums (Oricon)	185
New Zealand Albums (RMNZ)	31
Polish Albums (ZPAV)	40
Portuguese Albums (AFP)	50
Scottish Albums (Official Charts)	3
Slovak Albums (ČNS IFPI)	9
South Korean International Albums (Circle)	3
Spanish Albums (Promusicae)	27
Swedish Albums (Sverigetopplistan)	33
Swiss Albums (Schweizer Hitparade)	10
UK Albums (Official Charts)	3
US Billboard 200	31

=== Year-end charts ===
Chart (2018)	Position
Belgian Albums (Ultratop Flanders)	37
French Albums (SNEP)	177
Irish Albums (IRMA)	11
South Korean International Albums (Gaon)	80
UK Albums (OCC)	26
US Billboard 200	186

Chart (2019)	Position
Belgian Albums (Ultratop Flanders)	162
Irish Albums (IRMA)	42
UK Albums (OCC)	62

== Certifications ==
Region	Certification	Certified units/sales
Austria (IFPI Austria)	Gold	7,500^{‡}
Canada (Music Canada)	2× Platinum	160,000^{‡}
Denmark (IFPI Danmark)	Gold	10,000^{‡}
France (SNEP)	Gold	50,000^{‡}
Netherlands (NVPI)	Gold	20,000^{‡}
New Zealand (RMNZ)	3× Platinum	45,000^{‡}
Norway (IFPI Norway)	3× Platinum	60,000^{‡}
Poland (ZPAV)	Gold	10,000^{‡}
Singapore (RIAS)	Gold	5,000^{*}
United Kingdom (BPI)	Platinum	300,000^{‡}
United States (RIAA)	Platinum	1,000,000^{‡}
^{*} Sales figures based on certification alone.^{‡} Sales+streaming figures based on certification alone.
