= Brunelle =

Brunelle is a French surname. Notable people with the surname include:

- Hervé-Edgar Brunelle (1891–1950), Canadian politician and lawyer
- Honoré Brunelle Tourigny (1857–1918), surveyor, engineer and political figure in Quebec
- Liina Brunelle (born 1978), French-Russian actress
- Lucas Brunelle, videographer for bicycle events and a bicycle advocate
- Paul Brunelle (1923–1994), singer-songwriter and country guitarist of western Quebec
- Paule Brunelle (born 1953), Canadian politician
- Philip Brunelle, American conductor, choral scholar and organist
- René Brunelle (1920–2010), Ontario political figure

== See also ==
- Brunelles, a commune in the Eure-et-Loir department in northern France
