= Friends (Marshmello and Anne-Marie song) =

2018 single by Marshmello and Anne-Marie

Single by Marshmello and Anne-Marie

from the album Speak Your Mind
- Released: February 9, 2018
- Studio: Sarm Music Village (London)
- Genre: EDM; pop
- Length: 3:22
- Label: Joytime Collective; Asylum
- Songwriters: Christopher Comstock; Anne-Marie Nicholson; Eden Anderson; Richard Boardman; Jasmine Thompson; Natalie Dunn; Sarah Blanchard; Pablo Bowman
- Producer: Marshmello

Marshmello singles chronology
"Spotlight" (2018)	"Friends" (2018)	"Everyday" (2018)

Anne-Marie singles chronology
"Then" (2017)	"Friends" (2018)	"2002" (2018)

Music video
- "Friends" on YouTube

"Friends" (stylized in all caps) is a song by American DJ and producer Marshmello and British singer Anne-Marie. It was written by the artists, and Nat Dunn. The song was released via Joytime Collective and Asylum Records on February 9, 2018, as the fifth single from Anne-Marie's debut studio album, Speak Your Mind (2018). A lyric video was released on the same day. The song peaked at number four on the UK Singles Chart and at number 11 on the US Billboard Hot 100. "Friends" was the ninth best-selling single of 2018 with sales of 9.6 million track-equivalent units according to the International Federation of the Phonographic Industry (IFPI).

== Background and release ==
In 2016, Marshmello remixed Anne-Marie's song "Alarm". Fond of the remix, Anne-Marie wanted to collaborate with Marshmello, and eventually they met in a studio in London, where production of the song commenced. Initially Marshmello played some guitar, piano, synth and drum loops; listening to every single one they decided to proceed with guitar. Anne-Marie wrote the lyrics for the song corresponding to the loop. The major lyrics and drum sessions were completed in thirty minutes. Following next two hours, they completed the entire lyric session and the whole song was completed in three hours.

On February 4, 2018, both artists posted a teaser image for the single on social media, revealing the song's release date. They later posted a short audio clip on February 7, 2018. Speaking about the song with London Evening Standard, Anne-Marie said: "The idea came from a boy that I know that's my friend and he kind of he wanted to be more than my friend and I was like 'look brother how many times do I have to tell you we're just friends'. I thought it would be funny to write a song about it and there weren't that many songs about it and it works for Valentine's day for all the people who are single. I don't ever want him to know that it's about him because it's awkward. I do feel a bit bad but I'm trying to forget that it's about him and think about how funny it is about the situation."

Anne-Marie wrote on Genius: "I think this is the friend-zone anthem because I don't think there's been any other songs like this. I don't know if I've heard this, like this blatant in a song before. Like if you're trying to put someone in the friend zone, you can send them this song. And then everything will be sweet. That's why I feel like it's the friend-zone anthem."

Two clean versions exist; radio stations play a version where the swear word in “That’s how you f***ing spell friends” uses a radio-style censor, while the original censor of the word is left in for digital download.

== Composition ==
Anne-Marie wrote "Friends" alongside Marshmello. "Friends" is an EDM-pop song performed in the key of A minor using 4/4 time with a tempo of 95 beats per minute. The vocals span from D_{4} to C_{6}.

== Commercial performance ==
"Friends" entered at number 11 on the US Billboard Hot 100 for a few weeks, while it peaked at 4 on the UK Singles chart. "Friends" would be the ninth best-selling single of 2018 with sales of 9.6 million track-equivalent units according to the International Federation of the Phonographic Industry (IFPI). As of April 2026, the song had accumulated over 12.2 million video creations on TikTok, ranking 109th among the most-used songs on the platform worldwide.

== Critical reception ==
The song received generally positive reviews. Kat Bein of Billboard described the song as a blend of a wide variety of genres, writing: "The English singer delivers a bossy performance that would put any dog's tail between its legs, while Marshmello plays clever on acoustic guitar over a bumpin' electronic beat and even works in some G-Funk, West Coast synth work." Caitlin White of Uproxx called the song "a banger" that reaches "the level of unescapable that I most closely associate with the first time I heard The Chainsmokers wobbly pop ballad 'Paris'", stating that Anne-Marie "strikes the perfect balance between disdain and aggression". James Shotwell of Substream Magazine wrote: "'Friends' finds Marshmello abandoning the world of EDM for a far more traditional pop sound that perfectly pairs with vocalist Anne-Marie's entrancing croon." Brad McCrea of iHeartRadio deemed the song a combination of "strong dance beats" and "pop vocals from Anne-Marie". Mike Wass of Idolator noted that the song does not belong to the "sub-genre of pop songs about friends who become lovers", but instead is "a musical reminder to stop making a fool of yourself", calling the song "Marshmello's third big hit in a row", following "Silence" and "Wolves".

== Music videos and promotion ==
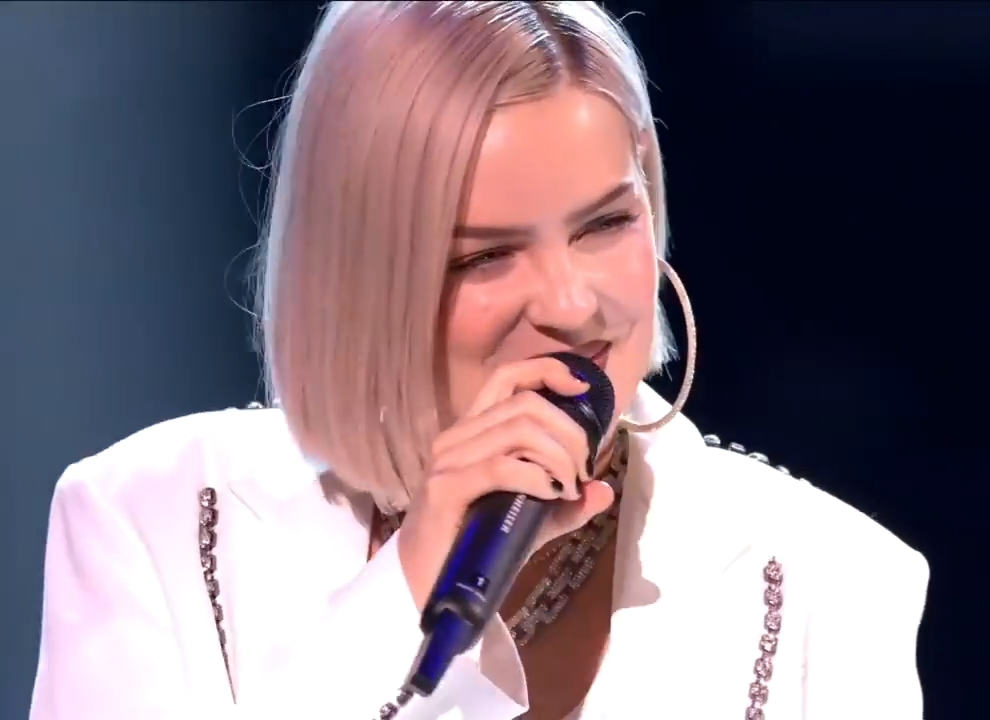
Anne Marie performing "Friends" at the MTV Europe Music Awards 2018.

A lyric video to "Friends" was first released on YouTube on February 9, 2018, at a total length of three minutes and twenty six seconds. As of October 2022, the lyric video has received over 1 billion views on YouTube. The music video, directed by Hannah Lux Davis, was released on February 16, 2018. In the video, Anne-Marie and a group of female friends host a house party. As the party comes to an end, Marshmello starts cleaning the house to avoid being asked to leave. However, Anne-Marie insists to kick him out, but he keeps finding ways to get back into the house, which annoys Anne-Marie and her friends. It echoes the song's lyrical content, by exploring the theme of being friend zoned, with Marshmello attempting to win Anne-Marie's love, but she just wants to be friends with him.

An alternate video was filmed at the Happy Place pop-up museum in Los Angeles and shows them in an upside down room, a yellow bathtub surrounded by rubber duckies, a giant neon XO with lip print wallpaper, a confetti-filled dome and a room filled with flowers. On March 7, 2018, Marshmello and Anne Marie joined to perform the song on The Tonight Show Starring Jimmy Fallon. The pair also performed a medley version of "Friends" alongside the single "Happier", with British band Bastille, at the 2018 MTV Europe Music Awards on November 4, 2018.

== Track listing ==
- Digital download
1. "Friends" – 3:22
- Digital download – acoustic version
1. "Friends" (acoustic) – 3:29
- Digital download – R3hab remix
1. "Friends" (R3hab remix) – 2:37
- Digital download – Sikdope remix
1. "Friends" (Sikdope remix) – 2:43
- Digital download – Borgeous remix
1. "Friends" (Borgeous remix) – 3:22
- Digital download – A Boogie wit da Hoodie remix
1. "Friends" (A Boogie wit da Hoodie remix) – 3:22
- Digital download – Justin Caruso remix
1. "Friends" (Justin Caruso remix) – 3:14

== Personnel ==
Credits adapted from Tidal.

- Marshmello – production, programming
- Anne-Marie – vocals
- Stuart Hawkes – master engineering
- Cameron Gower-Poole – engineering
- Michael Freeman – mix engineering assistance
- Spike Stent – mixing

== Charts ==
=== Weekly charts ===
Weekly chart performance for "Friends"
Chart (2018)	Peak position
Argentina Hot 100 (Billboard)	58
Australia (ARIA)	4
Austria (Ö3 Austria Top 40)	1
Belarus Airplay (Eurofest)	2
Belgium (Ultratop 50 Flanders)	2
Belgium (Ultratop 50 Wallonia)	2
Canada Hot 100 (Billboard)	5
Canada CHR/Top 40 (Billboard)	3
Canada Hot AC (Billboard)	15
Colombia (National-Report)	47
Croatia (HRT)	3
CIS Airplay (TopHit)	1
Czech Republic Airplay (ČNS IFPI)	7
Czech Republic Singles Digital (ČNS IFPI)	1
Denmark (Tracklisten)	2
Ecuador (National-Report)	32
El Salvador (Monitor Latino)	14
Estonia (Eesti Tipp-40)	2
Euro Digital Song Sales (Billboard)	4
Finland (Suomen virallinen lista)	5
France (SNEP)	14
Germany (GfK)	1
Greece (IFPI)	2
Hungary (Dance Top 40)	15
Hungary (Rádiós Top 40)	2
Hungary (Single Top 40)	2
Hungary (Stream Top 40)	1
Ireland (IRMA)	3
Israel (Media Forest)	1
Italy (FIMI)	23
Japan Hot 100 (Billboard)	32
Lebanon (OLT20)	2
Luxembourg Digital Song Sales (Billboard)	1
Malaysia (RIM)	1
Mexico Airplay (Billboard)	29
Netherlands (Dutch Top 40)	1
Netherlands (Single Top 100)	4
New Zealand (Recorded Music NZ)	6
Norway (VG-lista)	4
Paraguay (Monitor Latino)	6
Poland Airplay (ZPAV)	13
Portugal (AFP)	4
Romania Airplay (Media Forest)	1
Russia Airplay (TopHit)	1
Scottish Singles Sales (Official Charts)	8
Singapore (RIAS)	1
Slovakia Airplay (ČNS IFPI)	5
Slovakia Singles Digital (ČNS IFPI)	1
Slovenia (SloTop50)	8
South Korea International (Gaon)	15
Spain (Promusicae)	17
Sweden (Sverigetopplistan)	5
Switzerland (Schweizer Hitparade)	4
UK Singles (Official Charts)	4
Ukraine Airplay (TopHit)	56
US Billboard Hot 100	11
US Adult Pop Airplay (Billboard)	14
US Dance Club Songs (Billboard)	3
US Dance Airplay (Billboard)	1
US Pop Airplay (Billboard)	2
US Rhythmic Airplay (Billboard)	23
Venezuela (National-Report)	81

=== Monthly charts ===
Monthly chart performance for "Friends"
Chart (2018)	Peak position
Brazil Streaming (Pro-Música)	44

=== Year-end charts ===
Year-end chart performance for "Friends"
Chart (2018)	Position
Australia (ARIA)	27
Austria (Ö3 Austria Top 40)	7
Belgium (Ultratop Flanders)	7
Belgium (Ultratop Wallonia)	9
Canada (Canadian Hot 100)	16
Denmark (Tracklisten)	13
France (SNEP)	40
Germany (Official German Charts)	9
CIS (Tophit)	16
Hungary (Dance Top 40)	47
Hungary (Rádiós Top 40)	9
Hungary (Single Top 40)	18
Iceland (Plötutíóindi)	12
Ireland (IRMA)	8
Italy (FIMI)	87
Netherlands (Dutch Top 40)	11
Netherlands (Single Top 100)	19
New Zealand (Recorded Music NZ)	34
Portugal (AFP)	13
Romania (Airplay 100)	34
Russia Airplay (Tophit)	19
Slovenia (SloTop50)	35
Spain (PROMUSICAE)	42
Sweden (Sverigetopplistan)	20
Switzerland (Schweizer Hitparade)	28
UK Singles (OCC)	13
US Billboard Hot 100	26
US Adult Top 40 (Billboard)	43
US Dance Club Songs (Billboard)	35
US Dance/Mix Show Airplay (Billboard)	2
US Mainstream Top 40 (Billboard)	11
Worldwide (IFPI)	9
Chart (2019)	Position
Hungary (Rádiós Top 40)	32

== Certifications ==
Certifications for "Friends"
Region	Certification	Certified units/sales
Australia (ARIA)	4× Platinum	280,000^{‡}
Austria (IFPI Austria)	Gold	15,000^{‡}
Belgium (BRMA)	Platinum	20,000^{‡}
Canada (Music Canada)	7× Platinum	560,000^{‡}
Denmark (IFPI Danmark)	2× Platinum	180,000^{‡}
France (SNEP)	Diamond	333,333^{‡}
Germany (BVMI)	Platinum	400,000^{‡}
Italy (FIMI)	Platinum	50,000^{‡}
New Zealand (RMNZ)	4× Platinum	120,000^{‡}
Norway (IFPI Norway)	2× Platinum	120,000^{‡}
Poland (ZPAV)	4× Platinum	80,000^{‡}
Portugal (AFP)	2× Platinum	20,000^{‡}
Spain (Promusicae)	2× Platinum	80,000^{‡}
Switzerland (IFPI Switzerland)	Platinum	20,000^{‡}
United Kingdom (BPI)	3× Platinum	1,800,000^{‡}
United States (RIAA)	4× Platinum	4,000,000^{‡}
Streaming
Japan (RIAJ)	Gold	50,000,000^{†}
Summaries
Worldwide (2018)	—	9,600,000
^{‡} Sales+streaming figures based on certification alone.^{†} Streaming-only figures based on certification alone.

== Release history ==
Release history for "Friends"
Region	Date	Format	Version	Label	Ref.
Various	February 9, 2018	Digital download; streaming	Original	Joytime Collective; Asylum	
United States	February 12, 2018	Hot adult contemporary radio	Original	Warner Bros.	
United States	February 13, 2018	Contemporary hit radio	Original	Warner Bros.	
Italy	February 23, 2018	Contemporary hit radio	Original	Warner Bros.	
Various	March 23, 2018	Digital download; streaming	R3hab remix	Joytime Collective; Asylum	
Various	April 6, 2018	Digital download; streaming	Borgeous remix	Joytime Collective; Asylum	
Various	April 6, 2018	Digital download; streaming	Sikdope remix	Joytime Collective; Asylum	
Various	April 13, 2018	Digital download; streaming	A Boogie wit da Hoodie remix	Joytime Collective; Asylum	
Various	May 25, 2018	Digital download; streaming	Acoustic	Joytime Collective; Asylum	
Various	June 22, 2018	Digital download; streaming	Justin Caruso remix	Joytime Collective; Asylum	

== See also ==
- Friendzone
- List of number-one songs of 2018 (Malaysia)
- List of number-one songs of 2018 (Singapore)
