= Heavy (Anne-Marie song) =

Single by Anne-Marie

from the album Speak Your Mind
- Released: 22 September 2017
- Genre: Pop
- Length: 2:52
- Label: Major Tom's; Asylum
- Songwriters: Anne-Marie Nicholson; Uzoechi Emenike; George Astasio; Jason Pebworth; Jon Shave; Tash Phillips; Iain James
- Producers: The Invisible Men; Nana Rogues; MNEK; Nevada; Team Salut

Anne-Marie singles chronology
"Besándote" (2017)	"Heavy" (2017)	"Then" (2017)

"Heavy" is a song recorded by English singer Anne-Marie. It was released on 22 September 2017 as the third single from her debut studio album, Speak Your Mind (2018). A lyric video was released the same day.

== Composition ==
"Heavy" is a pop song that was compared to her previous single, "Ciao Adios". The song contains tropical-influenced beats that are found in much of the singer's recent work. The song was produced by The Invisible Men, Nana Rogues, Nevada, Team Salut, and MNEK.

== Critical reception ==
Steph Evans of Earmilk wrote that the song "follows the punchy pop of "Ciao Adios," with this single giving more life to Anne-Marie's vocal power."

== Track listing ==
Taken from iTunes.

No.	Title	Length
1.	"Heavy"	2:52

== Personnel ==
Adapted from Tidal.

- Anne-Marie Nicholson – lead vocals, songwriting
- The Invisible Men – songwriting, production, keyboard, programmer
- Tash Phillips – songwriting
- Iain James – songwriting
- MNEK – production, engineering, programmer
- Nevada – production, guitar, bass guitar, programmer
- Team Salut – production, guitar
- Nana Rogues – production, bass guitar, programmer
- Cameron Gower Poole – backing vocals, production, engineering
- Stuart Hawkes – mastering engineer
- Dylan Cooper – programmer
- Phil Tan – mixer

== Charts ==
Chart (2017)	Peak position
Belgium (Ultratop 50 Flanders)	31
Belgium (Ultratip Bubbling Under Wallonia)	12
Ireland (IRMA)	51
Scotland Singles (OCC)	33
UK Singles (OCC)	37

== Certifications ==
Region	Certification	Certified units/sales
United Kingdom (BPI)	Silver	200,000^{‡}
^{‡} Sales+streaming figures based on certification alone.

== Release history ==
Region	Date	Format	Label	Ref.
Various	22 September 2017	Digital download	Major Tom's; Asylum	
United Kingdom	29 September 2017	Contemporary hit radio	Warner; Asylum	
