= Remember I Told You =

Single by Nick Jonas featuring Anne-Marie and Mike Posner
- Released: May 26, 2017
- Recorded: 2017
- Genre: Pop; R&B
- Length: 3:21
- Label: Island; Safehouse
- Songwriters: Nick Jonas; Mike Posner
- Producers: Nick Jonas; The Monsters and the Strangerz; German

Nick Jonas singles chronology
"Bacon" (2016)	"Remember I Told You" (2017)	"Find You" (2017)

Anne-Marie singles chronology
"Ciao Adios" (2017)	"Remember I Told You" (2017)	"Either Way" (2017)

Mike Posner singles chronology
"In the Arms of a Stranger" (2016)	"Remember I Told You" (2017)	"Last Night" (2017)

"Remember I Told You" is a song by American singer Nick Jonas featuring English singer Anne-Marie and American singer-songwriter Mike Posner. It was released on May 26, 2017, through Island and Safehouse Records. The song was released only in streaming and digital formats.

== Background ==
During an interview with Hero, Jonas talked about the track saying "The new track was written last year while I was on tour, which is one of my favorite times to write, when I'm constantly in front of new audiences and being inspired on a nightly basis. It was a rainy day in Maine, so I went on the studio bus and I started this track and I really liked the way it sounded. I texted Mike Posner who was the special guest on the tour, I was like, hey man, why don't you come onto the bus, I've got this track going you might be into. He came out, listened to it two times, and was like, 'I love it, I've got some lyric ideas.' So he jumped in the booth, and within five hours from the time I started the beat to the time I eventually laid my vocals in with the lyrics that we'd written, it was pretty much done." On May 25, he revealed the cover art of the track on his Instagram page. On an interview with Official Charts, Jonas confirmed the song won’t be in the album.

== Critical reception ==
Hugh McIntyre of Forbes magazine acclaimed the song for its "healthy blend of pop sensibilities, R&B sultry vibes and a low-key electro beat", saying it has "all the makings of a cool summer sleeper hit, if not a serious smash. On his latest release, Jonas seems to mimic Drake’s vocal style when he slows things down and sings on an R&B/pop track, which usually turn out to be the most successful for the chart-topper." Erica Russell of Popcrush called the song a groovy and sexy slice of mildly tropical pop. The trio's smooth vocals intertwine seamlessly as they trade verses and merge on the chorus. It's not quite bright enough to be a summer anthem contender, but it'll definitely get caught between your ears—and it's a promising indication of things to come from Jonas' forthcoming album."

== Music video ==
On June 27, 2017, the music video of the song was released online was directed by Isaac Rentz. The clip starts in black-and-white with Jonas and the models parading through the stark white room. It cuts through scenes of Jonas both alone and surrounded by the group alongside shots of the models dancing, posing and drawing on the walls. As the song builds, Anne-Marie and Posner also join in.

== Live performances ==
The song was performed live for the first time during the Quebec Summerfest 2017 in Quebec City, Canada. He performed the song live during the finale of the BBC show Pitch Battle with Tring Park 16.

== Track listing ==
- Digital download
1. "Remember I Told You" (Clean version) – 3:21
- Digital download
1. "Remember I Told You" (Explicit version) – 3:21
- Digital download
1. "Remember I Told You" (Acoustic version) – 3:29
- Digital download
1. "Remember I Told You" (Explicit version) (Acoustic version) – 3:29
- Digital download
1. "Remember I Told You" (Frank Walker Remix) – 3:45
- Digital download
1. "Remember I Told You" (Explicit version) (Frank Walker Remix) – 3:46
- Digital download
1. "Remember I Told You" (Explicit version) (Dave Audé Remix) – 3:57

== Charts ==
Chart (2017)	Peak position
Australia (ARIA)	89
Belgium (Ultratip 50 Wallonia)	36
Canada Hot 100 (Billboard)	96
New Zealand Heatseekers (RMNZ)	4
Scotland Singles (OCC)	68
Sweden (Sverigetopplistan)	92
UK Singles (OCC)	97
US Dance Club Songs (Billboard)	10

== Release history ==
Region	Date	Format	Version	Label	Ref.
Various	May 26, 2017	Digital download	Original	Island; Safehouse	
Various	June 16, 2017	Digital download	Acoustic Version	Island; Safehouse	
Various	June 30, 2017	Digital download	Frank Walker Remix	Island; Safehouse	
Various	July 14, 2017	Digital download	Dave Audé Remix	Island; Safehouse	
