= Rockabye (song) =

2016 single by Clean Bandit

Single by Clean Bandit featuring Sean Paul and Anne-Marie

from the album What Is Love?
- Released: 21 October 2016
- Recorded: 2015
- Studio: Club Ralph, London; The Crypt Studio, London; Rokstone Studio, London
- Genre: Dance-pop
- Length: 4:11
- Label: Atlantic; Warner
- Songwriters: Jack Patterson; Ammar Malik; Ina Wroldsen; Sean Henriques; Steve McCutcheon
- Producers: Jack Patterson; Mark Ralph; Steve Mac

Clean Bandit singles chronology
"Tears" (2016)	"Rockabye" (2016)	"Symphony" (2017)

Sean Paul singles chronology
"Crick Neck" (2016)	"Rockabye" (2016)	"No Lie" / "Tek Weh Yuh Heart" (2016)

Anne-Marie singles chronology
"Catch 22" (2016)	"Rockabye" (2016)	"Ciao Adios" (2017)

Music video
- "Rockabye" on YouTube

"Rockabye" is a song by British electronic group Clean Bandit featuring Jamaican dancehall rapper Sean Paul and English singer Anne-Marie. It was released on 21 October 2016 and was their first single since Neil Amin-Smith's departure from the group and it served as the lead single from their second studio album, What Is Love? (2018). The song is about hardships of single mothers and alludes to the nursery rhyme and lullaby, "Rock-a-bye Baby". "Rockabye" is included on the deluxe edition of Anne-Marie's debut studio album, Speak Your Mind.

The song became 2016's Christmas number one on 23 December 2016, beating acts including Rag'n'Bone Man, Little Mix, Zara Larsson, Mariah Carey, Matt Terry, Louis Tomlinson and Steve Aoki to the Christmas number one spot. It is the first song in chart history to become Christmas number one after already being at the top of the charts for six weeks. In total, the song spent nine weeks at the summit of the UK Singles Chart while also topping the charts in over 28 other countries. It is certified 3× diamond in Poland, diamond in France, 9× platinum in Canada, and multi-platinum in twelve additional countries.

== Background and composition ==
"Rockabye" was written by Clean Bandit and Norwegian singer Ina Wroldsen, together with Ammar Malik and Steve Mac. Wroldsen wrote the lyrics about her son, which, according to Grace Chatto, "is why it rings so true for Clean Bandit and is so emotional and special." Wroldsen originally provided the vocal for the song but at last minute was swapped for Anne-Marie, who was signed to the same record label as Clean Bandit. The band fought their label to get Wroldsen on the record but failed, a situation that Grace described as "a terrible experience" which almost led to her quitting the band. "I did feel like I couldn't do it anymore because the idea that my business was hurting people [...] that was really painful," she told The Guardian. "I went completely crazy for a while after that. I just had to carry on, but inside it was really hard." Clean Bandit announced the single on 21 October 2016, just two days after Neil Amin-Smith quit the band. Talking to Digital Spy, Chatto said, "We've wanted to work with Sean Paul for a long, long while and it's a dream that we've managed to finally do it. Anne-Marie tells the story and we love her voice. We first heard her singing with Rudimental and we've met her at a million festivals over the past couple of years – it's been so lovely to collaborate together".

"Rockabye" is written in the key of A minor. It was composed in common time with a tempo of 102 beats per minute, and follows a chord progression of Am–F–G–Em. The vocals span from G_{3} to E_{5}.

== Music video ==
The video has 3.1 billion views on YouTube as of September 2025. It was written and directed by Grace Chatto and Jack Patterson of Clean Bandit. Cinematography by Anna Patarakina and Daria Geller, who the band originally met when Jack was at film school in Moscow aged 21. They have worked on many music videos directed by Jack and Grace, including "Mozart's House", "Dust Clears", and "Symphony". The actress pole dancer in the video, Rita Conte, Grace met and cast in Italy. The video for the song was released on 21 October 2016 and has a running time of 4 minutes and 11 seconds. Parts of it were shot on location in Cap Sa Sal, Begur, Spain and the George Tavern, London.

== Commercial performance ==
On 28 October 2016, "Rockabye" entered the UK Singles Chart at number seven. The following week, it climbed to three, before high performance in streaming got it to number one on its third week, dethroning "Shout Out to My Ex" by Little Mix, making it their second number one after "Rather Be", it also became Sean Paul's third and Anne-Marie's first number one in the UK. It subsequently spent nine consecutive weeks at number one, became Clean Bandit's first number one single in Australia, and additionally reached number one in Austria, Finland, Germany, the Republic of Ireland, New Zealand and Switzerland. On 23 December 2016, having already spent six weeks on top of the charts, "Rockabye" became the Christmas number one for 2016, making it the first song to do so that was not an X Factor winner's song, charity single, or stunt song since "Mad World" in 2003. However, it sold just 57,631 copies, becoming the lowest-selling Christmas number one of all time due to being helped by streaming (while actually being number two on the sales-only chart). It's gone on to spend a total of 41 weeks on the UK Singles Chart.

In the United States, "Rockabye" debuted at number 100 on the Billboard Hot 100 during the week of 24 December 2016, becoming Clean Bandit's first entry in this chart since "Rather Be" in 2014. It has since reached the top 10, reaching a current peak of number nine, the group's highest-charting song, exceeding the number 10 peak of "Rather Be". It is also Anne-Marie's first entry on the Billboard Hot 100 and her highest-charting song. On Billboard's Dance/Mix Show Airplay chart, the song reached number one in its 18 February 2017 issue, giving both Clean Bandit and Sean Paul their second number one on this chart, as well as Anne-Marie's first.

== Track listings ==
- Digital download
1. "Rockabye" – 4:11
- CD single
1. "Rockabye" – 4:11
2. "Rockabye" (Thomas Rasmus chill mix) – 3:38
- Digital download – Remixes EP
1. "Rockabye" (Jack Wins remix) – 5:05
2. "Rockabye" (End of the World remix) – 2:54
3. "Rockabye" (Elderbrook remix) – 3:28
4. "Rockabye" (Thomas Rasmus chill mix) – 3:38
- Digital download – Lodato & Joseph Duveen Remix
1. "Rockabye" (Lodato & Joseph Duveen remix) – 3:18
- Digital download – Autograf Remix
1. "Rockabye" (Autograf remix) – 4:09
- Digital download – Eden Prince Remix
1. "Rockabye" (Eden Prince remix) – 3:24
- Digital download – Ryan Riback Remix
1. "Rockabye" (Ryan Riback remix) – 3:54
- Spotify Singles
1. "Rockabye" (featuring Anne-Marie) – 3:45
2. "Work from Home" – 2:39

== Charts ==
=== Weekly charts ===
Weekly chart performance for "Rockabye"
Chart (2016–2025)	Peak position
Argentina Airplay (Monitor Latino)	10
Australia (ARIA)	1
Australia Dance (ARIA)	1
Austria (Ö3 Austria Top 40)	1
Belarus Airplay (Eurofest)	33
Belgium (Ultratop 50 Flanders)	2
Belgium Dance (Ultratop Flanders)	9
Belgium (Ultratop 50 Wallonia)	1
Belgium Dance (Ultratop Wallonia)	1
Brazil Hot 100 (Billboard)	9
Bulgaria Airplay (PROPHON)	1
Canada Hot 100 (Billboard)	4
Canada CHR/Top 40 (Billboard)	4
Canada Hot AC (Billboard)	14
Chile Anglo Airplay (Monitor Latino)	3
CIS Airplay (TopHit)	2
Colombia Airplay (National-Report)	31
Croatia International Airplay (Top lista)	1
Czech Republic Airplay (ČNS IFPI)	2
Czech Republic Singles Digital (ČNS IFPI)	1
Denmark (Tracklisten)	1
Ecuador Airplay (National-Report)	4
Euro Digital Song Sales (Billboard)	1
Finland (Suomen virallinen lista)	1
France (SNEP)	4
France Airplay (SNEP)	1
Germany (GfK)	1
Germany Dance (Official German Charts)	1
Greece Digital Songs (Billboard)	4
Guatemala Airplay (Monitor Latino)	15
Hungary (Dance Top 40)	1
Hungary (Rádiós Top 40)	2
Hungary (Single Top 40)	2
Ireland (IRMA)	1
Israel International Airplay (Media Forest)	1
Italy (FIMI)	1
Japan Hot 100 (Billboard)	89
Lebanon (Lebanese Top 20)	1
Luxembourg Digital Song Sales (Billboard)	2
Malaysia (RIM)	5
Mexico Airplay (Billboard)	1
Mexico Streaming (AMPROFON)	13
Netherlands (Dutch Top 40)	1
Netherlands (Single Top 100)	1
New Zealand (Recorded Music NZ)	1
Norway (VG-lista)	2
Panama Airplay (Monitor Latino)	9
Paraguay Airplay (Monitor Latino)	13
Philippines Hot 100 (Billboard)	8
Poland Airplay (ZPAV)	4
Poland Dance (ZPAV)	3
Portugal (AFP)	3
Romania Airplay (Media Forest)	3
Russia Airplay (TopHit)	1
Scottish Singles Sales (Official Charts)	1
Serbia Airplay (Radiomonitor)	1
Slovakia Airplay (ČNS IFPI)	2
Slovakia Singles Digital (ČNS IFPI)	1
Slovenia Airplay (SloTop50)	1
South Korea International (Gaon)	45
Spain (Promusicae)	4
Sweden (Sverigetopplistan)	1
Switzerland (Schweizer Hitparade)	1
Ukraine Airplay (TopHit)	1
UK Singles (Official Charts)	1
Uruguay Anglo Airplay (Monitor Latino)	2
US Billboard Hot 100	9
US Adult Contemporary (Billboard)	29
US Adult Pop Airplay (Billboard)	11
US Dance Club Songs (Billboard)	5
US Hot Dance/Electronic Songs (Billboard)	2
US Pop Airplay (Billboard)	4
US Rhythmic Airplay (Billboard)	32
Venezuela Airplay (National-Report)	26

2023 Weekly chart performance for "Rockabye"
Chart (2023)	Peak position
Belarus Airplay (TopHit)	157
Kazakhstan Airplay (TopHit)	55
Moldova Airplay (TopHit)	176
Romania Airplay (TopHit)	143

2024 Weekly chart performance for "Rockabye"
Chart (2024)	Peak position
Estonia Airplay (TopHit)	91
Kazakhstan Airplay (TopHit)	75

2026 Weekly chart performance for "Rockabye"
Chart (2026)	Peak position
Lithuania Airplay (TopHit)	89

=== Monthly charts ===
2016 Monthly chart performance for "Rockabye"
Chart (2016)	Peak position
CIS Airplay (TopHit)	2
Russia Airplay (TopHit)	2
Ukraine Airplay (TopHit)	41

2017 Monthly chart performance for "Rockabye"
Chart (2017)	Peak position
CIS Airplay (TopHit)	4
Russia Airplay (TopHit)	5
Ukraine Airplay (TopHit)	1

2024 Monthly chart performance for "Rockabye"
Chart (2024)	Peak position
Estonia Airplay (TopHit)	99

=== Year-end charts ===
2016 year-end chart performance for "Rockabye"
Chart (2016)	Position
Australia (ARIA)	66
Australia Dance (ARIA)	13
Austria (Ö3 Austria Top 40)	75
Belgium Dance (Ultratop Flanders)	71
CIS Airplay (TopHit)	103
Germany (Official German Charts)	59
Hungary (Dance Top 40)	60
Hungary (Single Top 40)	29
Netherlands (Dutch Top 40)	68
Netherlands (Dance Top 30)	33
Russia Airplay (TopHit)	99
UK Singles (Official Charts Company)	37

2017 year-end chart performance for "Rockabye"
Chart (2017)	Position
Argentina Airplay (Monitor Latino)	20
Australia (ARIA)	30
Austria (Ö3 Austria Top 40)	49
Belgium (Ultratop Flanders)	22
Belgium (Ultratop Wallonia)	8
Brazil Streaming (Pro-Música Brasil)	83
Canada (Canadian Hot 100)	9
CIS Airplay (TopHit)	13
Denmark (Tracklisten)	21
France (SNEP)	19
Germany (Official German Charts)	29
Hungary (Dance Top 40)	1
Hungary (Rádiós Top 40)	6
Hungary (Single Top 40)	6
Hungary (Stream Top 40)	13
Israel International Airplay (Media Forest)	4
Italy (FIMI)	5
Latvia Airplay (LaIPA)	14
Netherlands (Dutch Top 40)	23
Netherlands (Single Top 100)	19
New Zealand (Recorded Music NZ)	31
Panama Airplay (Monitor Latino)	21
Poland Airplay (ZPAV)	60
Portugal (AFP)	28
Russia Airplay (TopHit)	24
Slovenia Airplay (SloTop50)	5
Spain (Promusicae)	24
Sweden (Sverigetopplistan)	27
Switzerland (Schweizer Hitparade)	4
Ukraine Airplay (TopHit)	3
UK Singles (Official Charts Company)	23
US Billboard Hot 100	44
US Adult Top 40 (Billboard)	39
US Hot Dance/Electronic Songs (Billboard)	6
US Mainstream Top 40 (Billboard)	26

2018 year-end chart performance for "Rockabye"
Chart (2018)	Position
Hungary (Dance Top 40)	24
Hungary (Rádiós Top 40)	76
Ukraine Airplay (TopHit)	78

2023 year-end chart performance for "Rockabye"
Chart (2023)	Position
Kazakhstan Airplay (TopHit)	135

=== Decade-end charts ===
Decade-end chart performance for "Rockabye"
Chart (2010–2019)	Position
UK Singles (Official Charts Company)	57
US Hot Dance/Electronic Songs (Billboard)	48

== Certifications ==
Certifications and sales for "Rockabye"
Region	Certification	Certified units/sales
Australia (ARIA)	5× Platinum	350,000^{‡}
Austria (IFPI Austria)	Platinum	30,000^{‡}
Belgium (BRMA)	2× Platinum	40,000^{‡}
Canada (Music Canada)	9× Platinum	720,000^{‡}
Denmark (IFPI Danmark)	2× Platinum	180,000^{‡}
France (SNEP)	Diamond	233,333^{‡}
Germany (BVMI)	2× Platinum	800,000^{‡}
Italy (FIMI)	7× Platinum	350,000^{‡}
Netherlands (NVPI)	5× Platinum	200,000^{‡}
New Zealand (RMNZ)	5× Platinum	150,000^{‡}
Norway (IFPI Norway)	4× Platinum	160,000^{‡}
Poland (ZPAV)	3× Diamond	750,000^{‡}
Portugal (AFP)	2× Platinum	20,000^{‡}
Spain (Promusicae)	4× Platinum	160,000^{‡}
Switzerland (IFPI Switzerland)	2× Platinum	60,000^{‡}
United Kingdom (BPI)	4× Platinum	2,400,000^{‡}
United States (RIAA)	3× Platinum	3,000,000^{‡}
Streaming
Japan (RIAJ)	Gold	50,000,000^{†}
^{‡} Sales+streaming figures based on certification alone.^{†} Streaming-only figures based on certification alone.

== Release history ==
Release dates for "Rockabye"
Region	Date	Format	Version	Label	Ref.
Worldwide	21 October 2016	Digital download	Original	Atlantic Records; Warner Music Group	
Italy	28 October 2016	Contemporary hit radio	Original	Warner	
Worldwide	9 December 2016	Digital download	Remixes EP	Atlantic; Warner Music Group	
Worldwide	20 January 2017	Digital download	Lodato & Joseph Duveen Remix	Atlantic; Warner Music Group	
Worldwide	27 January 2017	Digital download	Autograf Remix	Atlantic; Warner Music Group	
Worldwide	10 March 2017	Digital download	Eden Prince Remix	Atlantic; Warner Music Group	
Worldwide	17 March 2017	Digital download	Ryan Riback Remix	Atlantic; Warner Music Group	
