= Either Way (Snakehips and Anne-Marie song) =

Single by Snakehips and Anne-Marie featuring Joey Badass
- Released: 28 July 2017
- Genre: Pop; futurepop; R&B
- Length: 3:07
- Label: Sony
- Songwriters: James David; Julia Michaels; Warren "Oak" Felder; Oliver Dickinson; Jo-Vaughn Scott
- Producers: Snakehips; Oak Felder; Cass Lowe

Snakehips singles chronology
"Right Now" (2017)	"Either Way" (2017)	"For the F^_^k Of It" (2018)

Anne-Marie singles chronology
"Remember I Told You" (2017)	"Either Way" (2017)	"Besándote (Remix)" (2017)

Joey Badass singles chronology
"500 Benz" (2017)	"Either Way" (2017)	"Still New York" (2018)

Music video
- "Either Way" on YouTube

"Either Way" is a song by British electronic music duo Snakehips and English singer Anne-Marie, featuring American rapper Joey Badass. It was written by James David, Julia Michaels, Warren "Oak" Felder, Oliver Dickinson and Joey Badass, with production handled by Snakehips, Oak and Cass Lowe. The song was released on 28 July 2017, via Sony Music.

== Critical reception ==
Kat Bein of Billboard felt that the song has a "cool R&B sound". He continued: "Some low-key tropical touches add to the lazy summer haze. It also doubles as dope makeup inspo." Marcus of EDM Sauce opined that the song is "elegantly crafted and natural", has "an R&B feel" and "some killer melody". Matt F of HotNewHipHop thinks that Snakehips brought "their brand of catchy pop flavor" to the song and Anne-Marie's "soft, melodic tones are contrasted nicely" with Joey Badass' "gruffer, deeper delivery". He regarded the song as "another solid entry into the current musical zeitgeist for Snakehips". Steph Evans of Earmilk described the collaboration as "a summertime pop jam that we'll remember". Jordan Farley of Run The Trap wrote: "The sultry single bounces catchy vocals between Anne-Marie and Joey Badass over a silky future pop beat and is instantly captivating in its elegant beauty." Kevin Apaza of Direct Lyrics wrote that the song is "so good" and "so catchy".

== Credits and personnel ==
Credits adapted from Tidal.

- Snakehips – producing, engineering
- Joey Badass – writing
- James David – composing, programming
- Julia Michaels – writing
- Warren "Oak" Felder – writing, co-producing, programming
- Oliver Dickinson – writing, programming, recording engineering
- Chris Galland – mixing engineering
- Robin Florent – mixing engineering
- Scott Desmarais – mixing engineering
- Dave Kutch – mastering engineering
- Manny Marroquin – engineering
- Cass Lowe – co-producing, programming
- Graeme Baldwin – recording engineering
- Cameron Poole – recording engineering

== Charts ==
Chart (2017)	Peak position
Australia (ARIA)	64
New Zealand Heatseekers (RMNZ)	4
Romania (Airplay 100)	96
Scotland Singles (OCC)	28
UK Singles (OCC)	47

== Certifications ==
Region	Certification	Certified units/sales
New Zealand (RMNZ)	Gold	15,000^{‡}
United Kingdom (BPI)	Silver	200,000^{‡}
^{‡} Sales+streaming figures based on certification alone.
