= Alarm (Anne-Marie song) =

2016 single by Anne-Marie

Single by Anne-Marie

from the album Speak Your Mind
- Released: 20 May 2016
- Recorded: 2015
- Studio: Rokstone Studios (London)
- Length: 3:25
- Label: Major Tom's; Asylum; Atlantic
- Songwriters: Anne-Marie Nicholson; Steve Mac; Wayne Hector; Ina Wroldsen
- Producers: Steve Mac; Amir Amor; Brunelle

Anne-Marie singles chronology
"Alright with Me" (2015)	"Alarm" (2016)	"Catch 22" (2016)

"Alarm" is a song by English singer and songwriter Anne-Marie. It was released on 20 May 2016 by Major Tom's, Asylum Records, and Atlantic Records as the lead single from her debut studio album, Speak Your Mind (2018). The song was written by Anne-Marie, Wayne Hector, Steve Mac and Ina Wroldsen, with the production being handled by Mac and additional production by Rudimental band member Amir Amor and additional synths and FX's added by Brunelle.

"Alarm" was a commercial success. It became Anne-Marie's first major worldwide hit, peaking at No. 16 on the UK Singles Chart. The single additionally reached the top 20 in Australia and Scotland, as well as the top 40 in seven countries. It was certified double platinum in the UK and Australia, and platinum in Canada, Italy, the Netherlands, New Zealand, Norway, and Poland. It has also been certified gold in the US, Germany and Denmark.

Anne-Marie performed the song at the beginning of the 2016 MTV Europe Music Awards. The music video for the song, also released on 20 May 2016, was directed by Malia James and filmed in Mexico City. It is loosely inspired by Baz Luhrmann's 1996 film Romeo + Juliet.

== Track listing ==
Digital download
No.	Title	Length
1.	"Alarm"	3:25

Acoustic version
No.	Title	Length
1.	"Alarm" (acoustic version)	3:08

Remixes EP
No.	Title	Length
1.	"Alarm" (featuring Chip) (Naughty Boy Remix)	3:24
2.	"Alarm" (Oliver Nelson Remix)	3:35
3.	"Alarm" (TroyBoi Remix)	4:11
4.	"Alarm" (Marshmello Remix)	3:39

== Charts ==
=== Weekly charts ===
Chart (2016–17)	Peak position
Australia (ARIA)	7
Austria (Ö3 Austria Top 40)	26
Belgium (Ultratip Bubbling Under Flanders)	5
Canada Hot 100 (Billboard)	97
Czech Republic Singles Digital (ČNS IFPI)	33
Germany (GfK)	27
Ireland (IRMA)	23
Italy (FIMI)	36
Latvia (Latvijas Top 40)	16
Netherlands (Single Top 100)	55
Norway (VG-lista)	28
Poland Airplay (ZPAV)	54
Portugal (AFP)	45
Scottish Singles Sales (Official Charts)	11
Slovakia Airplay (ČNS IFPI)	41
Slovakia Singles Digital (ČNS IFPI)	38
Sweden (Sverigetopplistan)	57
Switzerland (Schweizer Hitparade)	62
UK Singles (Official Charts)	16
US Bubbling Under Hot 100 (Billboard)	3
US Dance Airplay (Billboard)	7
US Pop Airplay (Billboard)	34

=== Year-end charts ===
Chart (2016)	Position
Australia (ARIA)	48
UK Singles (Official Charts Company)	56
US Dance/Mix Show Airplay (Billboard)	44

== Certifications ==
Region	Certification	Certified units/sales
Australia (ARIA)	2× Platinum	140,000^{‡}
Canada (Music Canada)	Platinum	80,000^{‡}
Denmark (IFPI Danmark)	Gold	45,000^{‡}
Germany (BVMI)	Gold	200,000^{‡}
Italy (FIMI)	Platinum	50,000^{‡}
Netherlands (NVPI)	Platinum	40,000^{‡}
New Zealand (RMNZ)	Platinum	30,000^{‡}
Norway (IFPI Norway)	Platinum	40,000^{‡}
Poland (ZPAV)	Platinum	20,000^{‡}
United Kingdom (BPI)	2× Platinum	1,200,000^{‡}
United States (RIAA)	Gold	500,000^{‡}
^{‡} Sales+streaming figures based on certification alone.

== Release history ==
Region	Date	Format	Label	Ref.
Worldwide	20 May 2016	Digital download	Major Tom's; Asylum	
United Kingdom	23 June 2016	Contemporary hit radio	Major Tom's; Asylum	
Worldwide	8 July 2016	Digital download (Remixes EP)	Major Tom's; Asylum	
Worldwide	15 July 2016	Digital download (Acoustic)	Major Tom's; Asylum	
United States	23 August 2016	Contemporary hit radio	Major Tom's; Asylum; RRP	
