= Then (Anne-Marie song) =

Single by Anne-Marie

from the album Speak Your Mind
- Released: 15 December 2017
- Studio: Rokstone Studios (London)
- Length: 3:34
- Label: Major Tom's; Asylum
- Songwriters: Anne-Marie Nicholson; Ina Wroldsen; Steve Mac
- Producer: Steve Mac

Anne-Marie singles chronology
"Heavy" (2017)	"Then" (2017)	"Friends" (2018)

"Then" is a song recorded by English singer Anne-Marie. It was released on 15 December 2017 as the fourth single from her debut studio album, Speak Your Mind (2018).

== Composition ==
"Then" is in the key of D minor, and moves at a tempo of 113 beats per minute in a 4/4 time signature. It is described as a mid-tempo song in which Anne-Marie "nostalgically evokes her different love stories, tirelessly repeating 'I loved you' by talking about her ex-partner." The song has been compared to Vaults' song "One Last Night" due to the string plucking in the song's instrumentation.

== Critical reception ==
Mike Wass of Idolator called the song "an emotional banger" and "[Anne-Marie's] best song of the year".

== Track listing ==
Digital download

1. "Then" – 3:34

== Personnel ==
Adapted from Tidal.

- Anne-Marie Nicholson – songwriting, vocals
- Ina Wroldsen – songwriting
- Steve Mac – songwriting, production, keyboard
- Stuart Hawkes – master engineering
- Dann Pursey – engineering
- Chris Laws – engineering, drums
- Michael Freeman – mix engineering assistance
- John Paricelli – guitar
- Mark "Spike" Stent – mixing

== Charts ==
Chart (2017–18)	Peak position
Netherlands (Tipparade)	15
UK Singles (OCC)	87

== Certifications ==
Certifications for "Then"
Region	Certification	Certified units/sales
United Kingdom (BPI)	Silver	200,000^{‡}
^{‡} Sales+streaming figures based on certification alone.

== Release history ==
Region	Date	Format	Label	Ref.
Various	15 December 2017	Digital download	Major Tom's; Asylum	
