= Perfect (Anne-Marie song) =

"Perfect to Me"

Single by Anne-Marie

from the album Speak Your Mind
- Released: 2 November 2018
- Studio: Strongroom Studios (London)
- Length: 3:17 (single version); 3:53 (album version)
- Label: Asylum
- Songwriter(s): Anne-Marie Nicholson; Jennifer Decilveo; Levi Lennox
- Producer(s): Jennifer Decilveo; Levi Lennox

Anne-Marie singles chronology
"Don't Leave Me Alone" (2018)	"Perfect to Me" (2018)	"Rewrite the Stars" (2018)

"Perfect" is a song by English singer Anne-Marie from her 2018 album Speak Your Mind. It was remixed and retitled "Perfect to Me" when released as a single on 2 November 2018. Scoop.co.nz reported the release of the song in mid-October, before Anne-Marie officially announced it on 31 October.

== Critical reception ==
News.com.au called the track "body positive" and said Anne-Marie had been striking a "resounding chord" with tracks like "Perfect". GQ reviewed Anne-Marie's live performance of the song at a Rough Trade store in Brooklyn, saying "she begins shouting her insecurities to the audience: about wanting longer legs, never fitting in, and eating copious amounts of dessert. Then she does the unthinkable. She grabs and pinches her own body fat onstage", going on to say she knows how to "put on a show".

== Promotion ==
Anne-Marie announced the release of the track on 31 October, and performed the new version for the first time live in the studio on BBC Radio 2 on 31 October 2018.

== Charts ==
Weekly chart performance for "Perfect"
Chart (2018–2019)	Peak position
Belgium (Ultratop 50 Flanders)	35
Belgium (Ultratip Bubbling Under Wallonia)	30
Ireland (IRMA)	34
New Zealand Hot Singles (RMNZ)	10
Scotland (OCC)	44
UK Singles (OCC)	41

== Certifications ==
Region	Certification	Certified units/sales
New Zealand (RMNZ)	Gold	15,000^{‡}
United Kingdom (BPI)	Gold	400,000^{‡}
^{‡} Sales+streaming figures based on certification alone.
