= Depressed (song) =

2025 single by Anne-Marie

Single by Anne-Marie
- Released: 19 September 2025
- Recorded: 2025
- Genre: Pop
- Length: 2:18 (single version); 2:56 (extended radio version)
- Label: Major Tom's; Asylum
- Songwriters: Anne-Marie Nicholson; Grace Barker; Henry Tucker; Ryan Linvill
- Producer: Linvill

Anne-Marie singles chronology
"Luv?" (2025)	"Depressed" (2025)	"Merry Xmas Everybody" (2025)

Lauren Spencer Smith singles chronology
"Friends Don't" (2025)	"Depressed" (remix) (2025)	"Last First Christmas" (2025)

Music video
- "Depressed" on YouTube

"Depressed" (stylised in all caps) is a song by English singer Anne-Marie. It was released on 19 September 2025 by Major Tom's and Asylum Records. Written by Anne-Marie Nicholson, Grace Barker, Henry Tucker, and Ryan Linvill, the song addresses themes of mental health struggles.

== Background and release ==
In July 2025, Anne-Marie spoke to BBC Radio 2 about experiencing postnatal depression and anxiety; she also talked about the difficulties of balancing motherhood with her career, stating that "getting back into music and being a mum has been really difficult".

On 2 August 2025, Anne-Marie previewed a new song on TikTok, which she had written the previous month. Following fan demand and the snippet going viral, with over 56,000 TikToks using the sound, she announced on 12 September 2025 that the single, titled "Depressed", would be released on 19 September 2025.

On October 2, 2025, Lauren Spencer Smith brought Anne-Marie on stage during as part of her The Art of Being a Mess World Tour. The pair performed the song together, with Smith singing a new verse. A studio version of the collaboration was released on 24 October 2025.

== Composition ==
"Depressed" is a pop song with stripped back production and "infectious pop hooks". Lyrically, it addresses themes of mental health struggles, including depression.

== Music video ==
The music video, directed by Benji Gershon, was filmed in London and released on 19 September 2025. It features Anne-Marie being hit by water balloons and walking down the street while dancing.

== Track listings ==
- Digital release
1. "Depressed" – 2:18
- Digital release – Less Depressed
1. "Less Depressed" – 2:57
2. "Depressed" – 2:18
- Digital release – More Depressed
1. "More Depressed" – 2:33
2. "Less Depressed" – 2:57
3. "Depressed" – 2:18
- Digital release – Lauren Spencer Smith remix
1. "Depressed (feat. Lauren Spencer Smith)" – 2:18
2. "More Depressed" – 2:33
3. "Less Depressed" – 2:57
4. "Depressed" – 2:18
- Digital release – Slightly Less Depressed
1. "Slightly Less Depressed (Unplugged)" – 2:12
2. "Depressed (feat. Lauren Spencer Smith)" – 2:18
3. "More Depressed" – 2:33
4. "Less Depressed" – 2:57
5. "Depressed" – 2:18

== Personnel ==
Credits adapted from Tidal.

- Ryan Linvill – producer, composer (all tracks); programming (tracks 2, 5); mixing (track 3, 4), remixer (track 3)
- Anne-Marie Nicholson – composer, vocals (all tracks)
- Grace Barker – composer (all tracks)
- Henry Tucker – composer (all tracks)
- Lauren Spencer Smith – composer, featured artist, vocals (track 2)
- Thomas Daniel – composer (track 2)
- Stuart Hawkes – mastering (tracks 2–5)
- Alex Ghenea – mixing (tracks 2, 5)
- Cameron Gower Poole – vocal producer (all tracks)
- Noah Conrad – horn (track 4)
- Dick Beetham – mastering (track 3)
- Duncan Brookfield – producer, guitar (track 1)
- Jeremy Cooper – mastering (track 1)
- Guy Langley – mixing (track 1)

== Commercial performance ==
In the United Kingdom, the Official Chart: First Look placed "Depressed" at number 15 based on early sales and streaming data. However, on 26 September 2025, the song entered the UK Singles Chart at number 41 with first-week sales of 9,313 track-equivalent units.

== Charts ==
Weekly chart performance for "Depressed"
Chart (2025)	Peak position
New Zealand Hot Singles (RMNZ)	14
Slovakia Airplay (ČNS IFPI)	50
South Korea BGM (Circle)	175
UK Singles (OCC)	41

== Release history ==
Release dates for "Depressed"
Region	Date	Format	Version	Label	Ref.
Various	19 September 2025	Digital download; streaming	Standard	Major Tom's; Asylum Records	
Various	26 September 2025	Digital download; streaming	"Less Depressed" (extended radio version)	Major Tom's; Asylum Records	
Various	17 October 2025	Digital download; streaming	"More Depressed" (stripped version)	Major Tom's; Asylum Records	
Various	24 October 2025	Digital download; streaming	"Depressed (feat. Lauren Spencer Smith)"	Major Tom's; Asylum Records	
Various	7 November 2025	Digital download; streaming	"Slightly Less Depressed" (unplugged version)	Major Tom's; Asylum Records	
