= Alright with Me =

Single by Wretch 32 featuring Anne-Marie and Prgrshn
- Released: 11 December 2015
- Recorded: 2014
- Genre: Hip-hop
- Length: 3:00
- Label: Ministry of Sound
- Songwriters: Emeli Sandé; Wretch 32

Wretch 32 singles chronology
"6 Words" (2014)	"Alright with Me" (2015)	"Flatline" (2016)

Anne-Marie single singles chronology
"Do It Right" (2015)	"Alright with Me" (2015)	"Alarm" (2016)

"Alright with Me" is a song by British rapper Wretch 32, featuring vocals from English singer Anne-Marie and Welsh singer Prgrshn. It was released as a digital download in the United Kingdom on 11 December 2015 through Ministry of Sound. The song was written by Emeli Sandé and Wretch 32.

== Music video ==
A music video to accompany the release of "Alright with Me" was first released on YouTube on 12 November 2015 at a total length of three minutes and twenty-five seconds.

== Track listing ==
Digital download – single
No.	Title	Length
1.	"Alright with Me" (featuring Anne-Marie and PRGRSHN)	3:00

Digital download – EP
No.	Title	Length
1.	"Alright with Me" (featuring Anne-Marie and PRGRSHN) (Extended)	4:36
2.	"Alright with Me" (featuring Anne-Marie and PRGRSHN) (Sonny Fodera Remix)	5:53
3.	"Alright with Me" (featuring Anne-Marie and PRGRSHN) (Alix Perez Remix)	4:08
4.	"Alright with Me" (featuring Anne-Marie and PRGRSHN) (essess Remix)	5:24
5.	"Alright with Me" (featuring Anne-Marie and PRGRSHN) (Tobtok Remix)	3:08

== Charts ==
Chart (2015)	Peak position
UK Hip Hop/R&B (Official Charts)	26
UK Indie (Official Charts)	22

== Release history ==
Country	Release date	Format	Label
United Kingdom	11 December 2015	Digital download	Ministry of Sound
