= Don't Leave Me Alone =

Single by David Guetta featuring Anne-Marie

from the album 7 and Speak Your Mind (Digital deluxe edition reissue)
- Released: 27 July 2018
- Genre: Dance-pop
- Length: 3:04
- Label: What a Music; Parlophone
- Songwriters: David Guetta; Linus Wiklund; Jonnali Parmenius; Sarah Aarons
- Producers: David Guetta; Lotus IV

David Guetta singles chronology
"Your Love" (2018)	"Don't Leave Me Alone" (2018)	"Goodbye" (2018)

Anne-Marie singles chronology
"Let Me Live" (2018)	"Don't Leave Me Alone" (2018)	"Perfect to Me" (2018)

Music video
- "Don't Leave Me Alone" on YouTube

"Don't Leave Me Alone" is a song by French DJ and music producer David Guetta featuring English singer Anne-Marie. It was written by Noonie Bao, Sarah Aarons, Guetta and Lotus IV, with production handled by the latter two. The song was released through What a Music and Parlophone, as the fourth single from Guetta's seventh studio album, 7 (2018). "Don't Leave Me Alone" is included on the deluxe edition reissue of Anne-Marie's debut studio album, Speak Your Mind.

== Critical reception ==
Writing for Grammy.com, Philip Merrill gave the song a positive review: "Touching and simple, this dance-jam prayer to stick together has a strong, independent outlook."

== Track listing ==
- Digital download
1. "Don't Leave Me Alone" – 3:03
- Digital download – Acoustic
1. "Don't Leave Me Alone" (Acoustic) – 3:08
- Digital download – EDX's Indian Summer Remix
1. "Don't Leave Me Alone" (EDX's Indian Summer Remix) – 3:30
2. "Don't Leave Me Alone" (EDX's Indian Summer Extended Mix) – 5:05
- Digital download – Oliver Heldens Remix
1. "Don't Leave Me Alone" (Oliver Heldens Remix) – 3:24
- Digital download – Remixes EP
1. "Don't Leave Me Alone" (R3hab Remix) (Radio Edit) – 3:02
2. "Don't Leave Me Alone" (David Guetta Remix) – 4:58
3. "Don't Leave Me Alone" (Sidney Samson Remix) – 4:31
4. "Don't Leave Me Alone" (Tom Staar Remix) – 3:51

== Charts ==
=== Weekly charts ===
Chart (2018– 2019)	Peak position
Australia (ARIA)	43
Austria (Ö3 Austria Top 40)	26
Belgium (Ultratop 50 Flanders)	27
Belgium Dance (Ultratop Flanders)	11
Belgium (Ultratop 50 Wallonia)	12
Belgium Dance (Ultratop Wallonia)	2
Bolivia (Monitor Latino)	16
Canada Hot 100 (Billboard)	66
Croatia (HRT)	17
Czech Republic Singles Digital (ČNS IFPI)	25
France (SNEP)	45
Germany (GfK)	32
Hungary (Rádiós Top 40)	19
Hungary (Single Top 40)	22
Hungary (Stream Top 40)	15
Ireland (IRMA)	16
Italy (FIMI)	67
Netherlands (Dutch Top 40)	22
Netherlands (Single Top 100)	39
Poland Airplay (ZPAV)	28
Portugal (AFP)	57
Romania (Airplay 100)	44
Scotland Singles (OCC)	8
Singapore (RIAS)	25
Slovakia Airplay (ČNS IFPI)	81
Slovakia Singles Digital (ČNS IFPI)	29
Spain (Promusicae)	73
Sweden (Sverigetopplistan)	25
Switzerland (Schweizer Hitparade)	43
UK Singles (OCC)	18
US Bubbling Under Hot 100 (Billboard)	21
US Dance Club Songs (Billboard)	3
US Hot Dance/Electronic Songs (Billboard)	14
US Pop Airplay (Billboard)	39
Venezuela (National-Report)	15

=== Year-end charts ===
Chart (2018)	Position
Belgium (Ultratop Flanders)	88
Belgium (Ultratop Wallonia)	85
US Hot Dance/Electronic Songs (Billboard)	32
Chart (2019)	Position
US Hot Dance/Electronic Songs (Billboard)	64

== Certifications ==
Region	Certification	Certified units/sales
Australia (ARIA)	Platinum	70,000^{‡}
Belgium (BRMA)	Gold	20,000^{‡}
Canada (Music Canada)	Platinum	80,000^{‡}
France (SNEP)	Gold	100,000^{‡}
Italy (FIMI)	Gold	25,000^{‡}
Norway (IFPI Norway)	Gold	30,000^{‡}
Poland (ZPAV)	Platinum	20,000^{‡}
United Kingdom (BPI)	Gold	400,000^{‡}
United States (RIAA)	Gold	500,000^{‡}
^{‡} Sales+streaming figures based on certification alone.

== Release history ==
Region	Date	Format	Version	Label	Ref.
Various	27 July 2018	Digital download	Original	What a Music; Parlophone	
Italy	27 July 2018	Contemporary hit radio	Original	Warner	
Various	17 August 2018	Digital download	Remixes EP	What a Music; Parlophone	
Various	31 August 2018	Digital download	Oliver Heldens Remix	What a Music; Parlophone	
Italy	7 September 2018	Contemporary hit radio	Oliver Heldens Remix	Warner	
United States	18 September 2018	Contemporary hit radio	Original	What a Music; Big Beat; Atlantic	
Various	28 September 2018	Digital download	Acoustic	What a Music; Parlophone	
Various	October 19, 2018	Digital download	EDX's Indian Summer Remix	What a Music; Parlophone	
