= Ciao Adios =

Single by Anne-Marie

from the album Speak Your Mind
- Released: 10 February 2017
- Recorded: 2016
- Genre: Pop; dancehall
- Length: 3:20
- Label: Major Tom's; Asylum
- Songwriters: Anne-Marie Nicholson; Tom Meredith; Jennifer Decilveo; Mason Levy
- Producers: Tom Meredith; MdL

Anne-Marie singles chronology
"Rockabye" (2016)	"Ciao Adios" (2017)	"Remember I Told You" (2017)

Music video
- "Ciao Adios" on YouTube

"Ciao Adios" is a song by English singer Anne-Marie. After performing it live in preview at KOKO, on 28 November 2016, it was released as the second single from her debut studio album, Speak Your Mind (2018) on 10 February 2017. Primarily a pop song with dancehall elements, "Ciao Adios" was written by Anne-Marie alongside Jenn Decilveo, Mason Levy, and Tom Meredith, with Meredith and Levy (MdL) handling production.

== Composition ==
"Ciao Adios" is a dancehall-inflected pop song. The song's lyrics refer to a girl who finds out that the guy she is dating is cheating on her, and thus she decides not to waste further time by leaving him: "Ciao, adios, I'm done"; ciao and adiós are respectively the Italian and Spanish words for '(good)bye'.

== Live performances ==
Anne-Marie performed "Ciao Adios" live in preview at KOKO, on 28 November 2016. She also performed the song on her 2016 tour.

== Music video ==
The "Ciao Adios" music video was released on 9 March 2017 on YouTube and features Anne-Marie with her girl gang dancing in Marrakesh (Morocco) with plenty of colours.

== Chart performance ==
In the UK and Ireland "Ciao Adios" reached numbers 9 and 13, respectively. The song gave Anne-Marie her first solo top 10 single in the UK and spent a total of 23 weeks on the chart.

== Track listing ==
- Digital download
1. "Ciao Adios" – 3:20
2. "Ciao Adios" (Extended Mix) - 7:56
3. "Ciao Adios" (Acoustic) - 4:44
- Digital download
1. "Ciao Adios" (Acoustic) – 4:44
2. "Ciao Adios" - 3:20
3. "Ciao Adios" (Extended Mix) - 7:56

== Charts ==
=== Weekly charts ===
Chart (2017)	Peak position
Australia (ARIA)	80
Austria (Ö3 Austria Top 40)	65
Belgium (Ultratop 50 Flanders)	28
Belgium (Ultratop 50 Wallonia)	6
CIS Airplay (TopHit)	43
Croatia (HRT)	65
Czech Republic Airplay (ČNS IFPI)	16
Czech Republic Singles Digital (ČNS IFPI)	73
France (SNEP)	115
Germany (GfK)	23
Hungary (Rádiós Top 40)	11
Hungary (Single Top 40)	33
Ireland (IRMA)	13
Israel International Airplay (Media Forest)	2
Mexico Airplay (Billboard)	30
Netherlands (Dutch Top 40)	4
Netherlands (Single Top 100)	18
Poland Airplay (ZPAV)	9
Russia Airplay (Tophit)	33
Scottish Singles Sales (Official Charts)	6
Serbia (Radiomonitor)	5
Slovakia Airplay (ČNS IFPI)	13
Slovakia Singles Digital (ČNS IFPI)	77
Slovenia (SloTop50)	32
Switzerland (Schweizer Hitparade)	64
UK Singles (Official Charts)	9

=== Year-end charts ===
Chart (2017)	Position
Belgium (Ultratop Flanders)	48
Belgium (Ultratop Wallonia)	23
CIS (Tophit)	153
Hungary (Rádiós Top 40)	64
Israel (Media Forest)	12
Netherlands (Dutch Top 40)	18
Netherlands (Single Top 100)	58
Poland (ZPAV)	82
Russia Airplay (Tophit)	146
UK Singles (Official Charts Company)	40

== Certifications ==
Region	Certification	Certified units/sales
Australia (ARIA)	Platinum	70,000^{‡}
Belgium (BRMA)	Gold	10,000^{‡}
Canada (Music Canada)	Gold	40,000^{‡}
France (SNEP)	Gold	66,666^{‡}
Germany (BVMI)	Platinum	400,000^{‡}
Italy (FIMI)	Gold	25,000^{‡}
Netherlands (NVPI)	2× Platinum	80,000^{‡}
New Zealand (RMNZ)	Gold	15,000^{‡}
Poland (ZPAV)	Platinum	50,000^{‡}
Switzerland (IFPI Switzerland)	Gold	10,000^{‡}
United Kingdom (BPI)	2× Platinum	1,200,000^{‡}
^{‡} Sales+streaming figures based on certification alone.

== Release history ==
Region	Date	Format	Version	Label	Ref.
Worldwide	10 February 2017	Digital download	Original	Atlantic	
Worldwide	7 April 2017	Digital download	Acoustic	Atlantic	
United States	18 April 2017	Top 40 radio	Original	Atlantic	
