= Do It Right (Anne-Marie song) =

Single by Anne-Marie
- Released: 20 November 2015
- Length: 3:15
- Label: Major Tom's; Asylum
- Songwriter(s): Anne-Marie Nicholson; Thomas Jules
- Producer(s): Show n Prove

Anne-Marie singles chronology
"Boy" (2015)	"Do It Right" (2015)	"Alright with Me" (2015)

"Do It Right" is a song by English singer Anne-Marie. Initially uploaded to SoundCloud on 15 October 2015, the song was later officially released as a single on 20 November 2015, through Major Tom's and Asylum Records. The song was written by Anne-Marie herself, alongside Thomas Jules, and was produced by Show N Prove. Upon its release, the song charted at number 96 on the UK singles chart and peaked at number 22 on the ARIA Charts in Australia, where the song was certified Platinum by the Australian Recording Industry Association (ARIA) for equivalent sales of 70,000 units in the country. A music video for the track was filmed in Melbourne, Australia, in late 2015. An EP of remixes was later released in the Netherlands on 26 February 2016.

== Track listing ==
- Digital download
1. "Do it Right" – 3:15
- Digital download (remixes)
1. "Do it Right"(Blinkie Remix) - 3:28
2. "Do it Right" (M.A.X Remix) - 5:28
3. "Do it Right"(Special Request Remix) (Club Mix) - 5:15

== Charts ==
Chart (2015–16)	Peak position
Australia (ARIA)	22
UK Singles (OCC)	90

== Certifications ==
Region	Certification	Certified units/sales
Australia (ARIA)	Platinum	70,000^{‡}
^{‡} Sales+streaming figures based on certification alone.

== Release history ==
Region	Release date	Format
Worldwide	20 November 2015	Digital download
Netherlands	26 February 2016	Digital download (remixes)
