= Luv 4 Luv =

Single by Robin S.

from the album Show Me Love
- Released: July 19, 1993
- Genre: House; garage
- Length: 4:13 (Stones radio edit); 7:43 (StoneBridge club mix)
- Label: Champion; Big Beat; ZYX
- Songwriters: Allan George; Fred McFarlane
- Producers: Allan George; Fred McFarlane

Robin S. singles chronology
"Show Me Love" (1993)	"Luv 4 Luv" (1993)	"What I Do Best" (1993)

Music video
- "Luv 4 Luv" on YouTube

"Luv 4 Luv" (sometimes also spelled as "Love for Love") is a song by American singer Robin S., released on July 19, 1993, by Champion, Big Beat and ZYX, as the second single from the singer's debut album, Show Me Love (1993). The song was written by Allen George and Fred McFarlane, and was Robin S.' second number one on the US dance chart, where it spent one week at the top. On other US charts, the song peaked at numbers 53 and 54 on the Billboard Hot 100 and the Cash Box Top 100. Overseas, "Luv 4 Luv" reached number 11 on the UK Singles Chart and number 24 in Ireland. A black-and-white music video was produced to promote the single, featuring Robin S. performing at a self-service laundry. "Luv 4 Luv" was re-released in the UK in 2003 but only lasted one week on the chart, peaking at number 78.

== Critical reception ==
Larry Flick from Billboard magazine wrote, "The up-and-coming Ms S. is out to prove that 'Show Me Love' was no fluke with this aggressive dance ditty from her sturdy debut album," adding, "Although the production is a little too familiar for its own good at times, the song itself is quite cool, and Robin cuts loose like a well-seasoned diva. Her star power is helping the track win the hearts of club pundits." Rod Edwards from the Gavin Report felt it has the potential to be even bigger than "Show Me Love", remarking that "a boomin' kick drum and carefully arranged synthesizers provide a "house"-influenced track, and Robin's emotion-filled vocals spice up the rhythm." Holly Barringer from Melody Maker complimented it as "acceptable; enjoyable, even."

Brad Beatnik from Music Week's RM Dance Update stated, "Expect this slice of pure garage heaven to be huge". Another RM editor, James Hamilton, named it a "typically wailed garage strider" in his weekly dance column. Wendi Cermak from The Network Forty wrote, "Keeping with the same formula [...] the Maven of House is back with another strong rhythmic mover. Although it could be argued that this single is very similar to 'Show Me Love', 'Luv 4 Luv' has so many subtle differences that it's not hard to tell the two apart." James T. Jones IV from USA Today praised her "gutsy, gospel-trained voice" that "digs deep" into the groove. James Hunter from Vibe felt it "brings personality and addictive soul to techno's faceless pulse. Plus, Robin S. have a friendly voice that can fire right up."

== Chart performance ==
"Luv 4 Luv" charted on the European, North American and African continent in 1993 and 1994. In Europe, the single was a top-10 hit in Flemish Belgium (7), Italy (9), the Netherlands (4), and Spain (7). In Austria, Finland, France, Germany, Iceland, Switzerland, and the UK, it was a top-20 hit. In the latter, the song peaked at number eleven in its second week on the UK Singles Chart on August 1, 1993. Having debuted at number twelve, "Luv 4 Luv" spent a total of six weeks within the UK Top 40. It fared even more successful on the Music Week Dance Singles chart and the Record Mirror Club Chart, peaking at numbers two and five, respectively.

Additionally, it was a top-30 hit in Ireland and Sweden, as well as on the Eurochart Hot 100, where it entered at number 57 on August 7, after charting in the UK. The single peaked on the chart at number 28 fifteen weeks later, on November 13. In the same period, it also reached number one on the European Dance Radio chart by Music & Media. In Northern America, it was a number-one hit on the US Billboard Dance Club Songs chart, spending one week at the top and a total of eleven weeks on the chart. On the Billboard Hot 100 and Cash Box Top 100, it peaked at numbers 53 and 54. In Canada, it was also a hit on the RPM Dance/Urban chart, reaching number three, behind Ace of Base's "All That She Wants" and Zhané's "Hey Mr. D.J.". In Africa, "Luv 4 Luv" charted in Zimbabwe, peaking at number three.

== Track listings ==
- 12-inch single, Germany (1993)
1. "Luv 4 Luv" (Stones Club Mix) — 6:05
2. "Luv 4 Luv" (Stones Dark Mix) — 5:37
3. "Luv 4 Luv" (Nick Nice Club Mix) — 5:03
- CD single, UK (1993)
1. "Luv 4 Luv" (Stone's Radio Edit) — 4:14
2. "Luv 4 Luv" (Stone's Club Mix) — 6:07
3. "Luv 4 Luv" (Stone's Dark Mix) — 5:40
4. "Luv 4 Luv" (Nick Nice Club Mix) — 5:05
5. "Luv 4 Luv" (Stone's Essential Mix) — 5:39
6. "Luv 4 Luv" (J.J.'s Mellow Mix) — 5:23
7. "Luv 4 Luv" (Old School Mix) — 6:29

Note: Some UK pressings had 8 tracks listed on the CD and inlay of the1993 release.
"Luv 4 Luv (Stone's Instrumental)" was listed but NOT included. The correct track listing is as shown above.

- CD maxi, Sweden (1993)
1. "Luv 4 Luv" (Stones Radio Edit) — 4:13
2. "Luv 4 Luv" (Stones Club Mix) — 6:06
3. "Luv 4 Luv" (Stones Dark Mix) — 5:37
4. "Luv 4 Luv" (Nick Nice Club Mix) — 5:02
- CD maxi single, UK (2003)
1. "Luv 4 Luv" (Tonka's 2003 New Radio Mix) — 5:11
2. "Luv 4 Luv" (Tonka's 2003 First Club Mix) — 5:38
3. "Luv 4 Luv" (Original Stonebridge Club Mix) — 6:04

== Personnel ==
- Producer – Allen George, Fred McFarlane
- Co-producer – StoneBridge
- Mix – StoneBridge, P. Dennis Mitchell, Junior Vasquez
- Engineer – P. Dennis Mitchell, Dave Sussman, Nat Foster, Robert Kiss
- Keyboards – Fred McFarlane, Joe Moskowitz, Matt Thomas, Stonebridge, Robert Kiss
- Guitar – Paul Jackson Jr., Dana Reed, Mike Cantwell
- Backing vocals – Dana Reed, Debbie Cole, Dennis Taylor, Kim Miller, Luci Martin, Robin Stone, Vivian Sessoms

== Charts ==
=== Weekly charts ===
Weekly chart performance for "Luv 4 Luv"
Chart (1993–1994)	Peak position
Austria (Ö3 Austria Top 40)	16
Belgium (Ultratop 50 Flanders)	7
Canada Retail Singles (The Record)	10
Canada Dance/Urban (RPM)	3
Europe (Eurochart Hot 100)	28
Europe (European Dance Radio)	1
Europe (European Hit Radio)	25
Finland (Suomen virallinen lista)	18
France (SNEP)	15
Germany (GfK)	20
Iceland (Íslenski Listinn Topp 40)	20
Ireland (IRMA)	24
Israel (Israeli Singles Chart)	23
Italy (Musica e dischi)	9
Netherlands (Dutch Top 40)	4
Netherlands (Single Top 100)	5
Quebec (ADISQ)	34
Spain (AFYVE)	7
Sweden (Sverigetopplistan)	21
Switzerland (Schweizer Hitparade)	20
UK Singles (Official Charts)	11
UK Airplay (Music Week)	12
UK Dance (Music Week)	2
UK Club Chart (Music Week)	5
US Billboard Hot 100	53
US Dance Club Play (Billboard)	1
US Hot R&B Singles (Billboard)	52
US Maxi-Singles Sales (Billboard)	4
US Top 40/Rhythm-Crossover (Billboard)	29
US Cash Box Top 100	54
Zimbabwe (ZIMA)	3

=== Year-end charts ===
Year-end chart performance for "Luv 4 Luv"
Chart (1993)	Position
Belgium (Ultratop 50 Flanders)	44
Canada Dance/Urban (RPM)	34
Europe (Eurochart Hot 100)	99
Europe (European Dance Radio)	9
Netherlands (Dutch Top 40)	40
Netherlands (Single Top 100)	49
UK Singles (OCC)	96
UK Club Chart (Music Week)	64
US Maxi-Singles Sales (Billboard)	18

== See also ==
- List of number-one dance singles of 1993 (U.S.)
