= I Want to Thank You =

Song by Alicia Myers

Single by Alicia Myers

from the album Alicia and I Fooled You This Time
- Released: September 18, 1982
- Recorded: 1981
- Genre: Post disco; R&B; contemporary gospel
- Length: 3:47
- Label: MCA
- Songwriter: Kevin McCord
- Producers: Irene Perkins; Kevin McCord

Alicia Myers singles chronology
"Do Your Kind of Dance" (1981)	"I Want to Thank You" (1982)	"Is It Really Real" (1983)

"I Want to Thank You" is a song by American singer Alicia Myers, released in 1981, originally as a track from her debut album, Alicia (1981). The song was later included as a single on her 1982 album, I Fooled You This Time, due to its heavy rotation in clubs by DJs in the United States and United Kingdom. The song was written by Kevin McCord, bassist for Myers' former band One Way, who also produced it alongside Irene Perkins. It debuted on the US Billboard Hot Black Singles chart, where it ran for 11 weeks, peaking at number 37 in November 1982. In 2022, Rolling Stone magazine ranked "I Want to Thank You" number 136 in their list of the "200 Greatest Dance Songs of All Time".

== Charts ==
=== Weekly charts ===
Chart (1982)	Peak position
US Hot Black Singles (Billboard)	37

=== Year-end charts ===
Chart (1982)	Position
US Hot Black Singles (Billboard)	143

== Lawsuit with Mariah Carey ==
In June 1994, the song's writer, Kevin McCord, sued American singer Mariah Carey and her music team for incorporating significant musical elements from "I Want to Thank You" into her 1991 song "Make It Happen". McCord stated, "If you listen to the chords at the beginning of the song, the similarity is obvious. It's the exact same chords in a different key." He also noted lyrical similarities. Carey's side initially claimed McCord had no standing to sue, but McCord's attorney showed the song's copyright owners had transferred their legal interest in "I Want to Thank You" to McCord "in an effort to adjudicate their claims". Though a Carey spokesperson maintained the copyright infringement allegations were false, McCord said he had turned down settlement offers from Carey's camp. McCord eventually accepted a settlement offer of about US$500,000.

== Robin S. version ==
"I Want to Thank You"

Single by Robin S.

from the album Show Me Love
- Released: March 7, 1994
- Genre: house; garage; gospel
- Length: 3:48
- Label: Champion; Big Beat
- Songwriter: Kevin McCord
- Producers: Allen George; Fred McFarlane; Junior Vasquez

Robin S. singles chronology
"What I Do Best" (1993)	"I Want to Thank You" (1994)	"Back It Up" (1994)

"I Want to Thank You" was later re-recorded as a house track by American singer and songwriter Robin S., released in March 1994 by Champion and Big Beat Records as the fourth single from her debut album, Show Me Love (1993). This version was produced by Allen George, Fred McFarlane, and Junior Vasquez. It was a minor hit in Europe, peaking at number 39 in Belgium and number 48 on the UK Singles Chart. In the US, it reached number three, five and ten on the Billboard Bubbling Under Hot 100, Dance Singles Sales and Hot Dance Club Play charts.

=== Critical reception ===
Larry Flick from Billboard magazine wrote, "Thanks in large part to the eternally golden remix hand of David Morales, the voice behind the massive 'Show Me Love' is poised to flood dancefloors again. Her solid rendition of this gospel-tinged disco evergreen is enhanced by Morales' savvy blend of groove and slick synths. Junior Vasquez, the track's original co-producer, drops a couple of sturdy versions that are darker and geared more toward underground tastes." British magazine Music Week's RM Dance Update named it a "smooth soulful cover version". RM editor James Hamilton described it as a "incredibly coincidental almost Degrees of Motion ['Shine On'] answering 'thank you Heavenly Father for shining your light on me' inspirational loper" in his weekly dance column. Chuck Arnold from Philadelphia Daily News complimented it as a "spiritual stomper".

=== Track listings ===
- 12-inch single, UK (1994)
1. "I Want to Thank You" (Bad Yard Club Mix)
2. "I Want to Thank You" (Bad Yard Dub)
3. "I Want to Thank You" (Accapella)
4. "I Want to Thank You" (Extended Mix)
5. "I Want to Thank You" (Extended Dub Mix)
6. "I Want to Thank You" (Africa)
- CD single, France (1994)
1. "I Want to Thank You" (Radio Edit) — 3:48
2. "I Want to Thank You" (L.P Edit) — 3:58
- CD single, UK (1994)
1. "I Want to Thank You" (Radio Edit) — 3:50
2. "I Want to Thank You" (Radio Edit 2) — 3:55
3. "I Want to Thank You" (Bad Yard Club Mix) — 9:02
4. "I Want to Thank You" (Bad Yard Dub) — 5:46
5. "I Want to Thank You" (Accapella) — 0:49
6. "I Want to Thank You" (Extended Mix) — 5:38
7. "I Want to Thank You" (Extended Dub) — 4:45
8. "I Want to Thank You" (Africa) — 5:38
- CD maxi, Germany (1994)
1. "I Want to Thank You" (Radio Edit) — 3:48
2. "I Want to Thank You" (Radio Edit 2) — 3:58
3. "I Want to Thank You" (Bad Yard Club Mix) — 8:59

=== Charts ===
Chart (1994)	Peak position
Belgium (Ultratop 50 Flanders)	36
Netherlands (Dutch Top 40 Tipparade)	17
Netherlands (Dutch Single Tip)	5
Scotland (OCC)	51
UK Singles (OCC)	48
UK Dance (Music Week)	8
UK Club Chart (Music Week)	7
US Bubbling Under Hot 100 (Billboard)	3
US Dance Singles Sales (Billboard)	5
US Hot Dance Club Play (Billboard)	10
