= I Want to Thank You (disambiguation) =

"I Want to Thank You" is a 1981 song by Alicia Myers.

"I Want to Thank You" may also refer to:

- "I Want to Thank You" (1965), by Otis Redding on the album The Great Otis Redding Sings Soul Ballads
- "I Want to Thank You" (1969), by Billy Preston on the album That's the Way God Planned It
- "I Want to Thank You" (1993), by Robin S. on the album Show Me Love

== See also ==
- I Wanna Thank Me, 2019 studio album by Snoop Dogg
  - "I Wanna Thank Me" (song), the title track
- "Kind & Generous", or "I Want to Thank You Song" by Natalie Merchant
