= I Wrote a Song =

2023 single by Mae Muller

Single by Mae Muller

from the album Sorry I'm Late
- Released: 9 March 2023
- Genre: Dance-pop; Latin pop
- Length: 2:45 (original version); 3:06 (video version)
- Label: Universal; Capitol; EMI
- Songwriters: Holly Mae Muller; Karen Poole; Lewis Thompson
- Producers: Lewis Thompson; Alfred Parx

Mae Muller singles chronology
"Feels This Good" (2023)	"I Wrote a Song" (2023)	"Me, Myself & I" (2023)

Music video
- "I Wrote a Song" on YouTube

Eurovision Song Contest 2023 entry
- Country: United Kingdom
- Artist: Mae Muller
- Language: English
- Composers: Holly Mae Muller; Karen Poole; Lewis Thompson
- Lyricists: Holly Mae Muller; Karen Poole; Lewis Thompson

Finals performance
- Final result: 25th
- Final points: 24

Entry chronology
- ◄ "Space Man" (2022)
- "Dizzy" (2024) ►

Official performance video
- "I Wrote a Song" (Grand Final) on YouTube

"I Wrote a Song" is a song by English singer Mae Muller, who wrote the track with Karen Poole and Lewis Thompson, the latter of whom produced it with Alfred Parx. It was released on 9 March 2023 as the third single from Muller's debut studio album Sorry I'm Late (2023), and was selected by TaP Music and the BBC to represent the United Kingdom in the Eurovision Song Contest 2023. In the Eurovision final, "I Wrote a Song" finished in 25th place with 24 points.

Prior to the Eurovision Song Contest, "I Wrote a Song" debuted at number 30 on the UK Singles Chart, and became the first UK Eurovision entry in over a decade to debut inside the chart's top 40. After the contest, it reached a new peak of number nine, becoming Muller's first UK top ten single. It also entered the top 30 in Iceland and Lithuania and reached the top 50 in Ireland.

== Background and release ==
On 9 March 2023, Muller was announced as the UK's entry for the Eurovision Song Contest 2023 in Liverpool, during The Radio 2 Breakfast Show with Zoe Ball and studio guest Rylan Clark. Muller is the first woman to represent the UK at the contest since SuRie, in 2018. Her contest entry "I Wrote a Song" was released on the same day, accompanied by a music video which premiered on the Eurovision Song Contest's official YouTube channel. It was released onto all streaming platforms on the same day.

== Production and composition ==
Despite the title, Muller in fact co-wrote "I Wrote a Song" in January 2023 with songwriters Karen Poole and Lewis Thompson, who all co-produced the track, with production from Alfred Parx (L Devine) and Lewis Thompson. It lyrically addresses channeling your anger and taking revenge on a cheating ex. The song runs for a total of 2 minutes and 45 seconds and explores themes of self-worth, heartbreak, and empowerment.

Critics described "I Wrote a Song" as a balearic and Latin-pop track with elements of electropop. Comparisons were made to Dua Lipa to Robin S single "Show Me Love" and "Mr. Saxobeat" by Alexandra Stan. In an interview for NME, Muller said how her single is all about how to cope with "defeat following a breakup" and how to feel empowered afterwards.

== Critical response ==
"I Wrote a Song" was met with positive reviews from critics. Alexis Petridis from The Guardian gave it a three-star rating out of five, commenting that "it was better than most of our entries in previous years but failed to stand out compared to last year's entry 'Space Man'". He also drew comparisons to "Dua Lipa-esque electronic pop, underpinned by a rhythm track influenced by the sound of Robin S.’s 90s house hit 'Show Me Love', with its uptempo waltzing rhythm is also a Europop trope, reminiscent of Mediterranean holiday hits such as 'Mr. Saxobeat'."

Writing for the Daily Telegraph, James Hall described it as "a clever, sassy, precision-tooled banger" with a four-star rating out of five. He commented how "Muller sings the first verse over this before a bouncy bassline kicks in and we have a flamenco guitar-tinged middle eight that sounds like a chorus. The song is perfectly calibrated. It combines the lemon zing of revenge with a sprinkle of inner city smarts, a dollop of campness and some club ready beats." He gave praise to the organisers for picking a wise risk.

The Official Charts Company described it as "a pop stomper, all about Mae funneling her anger at the betrayal of an ex-partner." They added "how it's the freshest sounding UK Eurovision entry for countless years, sounding like something that actually belongs on radio rotation and your new music playlists."

== Chart performance ==
In its release week, "I Wrote a Song" reached number three on the Official Big Top 40. On the UK Singles Chart, "I Wrote a Song" debuted at number 30, making it Muller's first top 40 entry as a solo artist, and her highest-peaking single. It became the first Eurovision UK entry in over a decade to debut inside the Official Top 40 in its first week, since Blue in 2011 with "I Can". On Friday 19 May, a week after the Eurovision Grand Final, "I Wrote a Song" had the biggest jump in the UK Singles Chart from number 45 to a new peak at number 9. Also, the song topped the Official Trending Chart, as measured by the Official Charts Company.

== Promotion ==
Following the announcement that Muller would be representing the UK in Liverpool, she appeared in a special programme later that evening on BBC One, called Eurovision 2023: Meet the UK Act, where she was interviewed by Scott Mills which was followed by the first full televised broadcast of the song's music video. The show was watched by an audience of over 2.76 million, becoming the second most-watched television programme in the UK that day.

"I Wrote a Song" received its debut performance in Barcelona, during a Eurovision pre-party concert, and was further promoted at other Eurovision pre-parties.

== Eurovision Song Contest ==
=== Selection ===
The British entry for the 2023 contest was internally selected by the BBC in collaboration with TaP Music. The selection process was confirmed on 8 September 2022, following the successful result for the United Kingdom at the 2022 contest. Rachel Ashdown, Commissioning Editor for the BBC, stated:

"We are thrilled that Ben Mawson and Ed Millett plus the team at TaP will once again bring their unrivalled expertise to work with the BBC and BBC Studios to find an act and song to represent the UK at Eurovision. I hope we can find another artist who will not only be a brilliant ambassador for Eurovision but like Sam will sing their head off with a stand out song."

— Rachel Ashdown

On 31 January 2023, it was reported that four acts were left in the running to represent the United Kingdom at the 2023 contest. Among the rumoured candidates were Rina Sawayama, with Radio Times stating that she would represent the UK at the 2023 contest, though this was later denied by Sawayama's management; and Mimi Webb.

On 9 March 2023, Mae Muller was announced as the chosen entrant with her song "I Wrote a Song".

=== At Eurovision ===
The Eurovision Song Contest 2023 took place at the Liverpool Arena in Liverpool. According to Eurovision rules, all nations with the exceptions of the host country and the "Big Five" (France, Germany, Italy, Spain and the United Kingdom) are required to qualify from one of two semi-finals in order to compete for the final; the top ten countries from each semi-final progress to the final. As such, the United Kingdom automatically qualified to compete in the final as both the host country and a member of the "Big Five". On 13 March 2023, during the Heads of Delegation meeting, the UK was drawn to perform in position 26. It finished 25th with 24 points.

== Charts ==
Chart performance for "I Wrote a Song"
Chart (2023)	Peak position
CIS (TopHit)	133
Greece International (IFPI)	57
Iceland (Tónlistinn)	23
Ireland (IRMA)	44
Lithuania (AGATA)	23
Russia Airplay (TopHit)	125
Sweden Heatseeker (Sverigetopplistan)	10
UK Singles (Official Charts)	9

== Certifications ==
Region	Certification	Certified units/sales
United Kingdom (BPI)	Silver	200,000^{‡}
^{‡} Sales+streaming figures based on certification alone.
