= Who's Foolin' Who =

Who's Foolin' Who may refer to:

- Who's Foolin' Who (One Way album), a One Way album from 1982.
- Who's Foolin' Who (Bonfire album), a Bonfire greatest hits album from 2000.
- "Who's Foolin’ Who", a song from Tony Iommi's 2000 solo album, Iommi, featuring Ozzy Osbourne.
