= Alicia (Alicia Myers album) =

Studio album by Alicia Myers
- Released: 1981
- Recorded: 1981
- Studio: PAC 3 Recording Company (Dearborn, Michigan)
- Genre: R&B
- Length: 33:01
- Label: MCA
- Producers: Al Perkins; James Dean; John Glover; Kevin McCord

Alicia Myers chronology
Alicia (1981)	Alicia Again (1981)

Singles from Alicia
- 1. "Reservation for One" Released: 1981; 2. "Don’t Stop What You’re Doin'" Released: 1981; 3. "I Want to Thank You" Released: 1982

Alicia is the debut album by singer Alicia Myers released on the MCA label. It is her first album after her departure from One Way in 1981, which she joined in 1978. The album contains the Top 40-hit single "I Want to Thank You", released in 1982. The album peaked at 41 on the US R&B Albums Chart in 1981, spending 25 weeks on the chart.

Professional ratings
Review scores
Source	Rating
Allmusic	4.1/5 stars

== History ==
The album had three singles released. "I Want to Thank You" was the only single to chart, peaking at No. 37 on the R&B chart in November 1982 after 11 weeks on the chart.

== Track listing ==
Side one
No.	Title	Writer(s)	Length
1.	"Don’t Stop What You’re Doin’"	Kevin McCord	3:22
2.	"If You Play Your Cards Right"	McCord	5:58
3.	"Spirit of the Boogie"	McCord	4:52
4.	"We Can’t Stay in Bed Forever"	McCord, Vee Allen	3:15

Side two
No.	Title	Writer(s)	Length
5.	"Reservation for One"	James Dean, John Glover	4:54
6.	"I Want to Thank You"	McCord	3:47
7.	"Reggae Funky Dance"	McCord	4:48
8.	"Life, Joy, and Happiness"	McCord	4:07

== Production ==
- Richard Becker - engineer
- Steve Hall - mastering
- Benno Friedman - photography
- Al Perkins, James Dean, John Glover (track 5), Kevin McCord (tracks: 1–4, 6–8) - producers

== Charts ==
Chart (1981)	Peak position
US Top Black Albums (Billboard)	41

=== Singles ===
Year	Single	Chart positions
Year	Single	US R&B
1982	"I Want to Thank You"	37
