= I Just Came to Dance =

I Just Came to Dance or variants may refer to:

== Music ==
=== Songs ===
- "I Just Came to Dance", a song by Mae Muller from the album Sorry I'm Late, 2023
- "I Just Came to Dance", a song by S Club 8 from the album Sundown, 2003
