= What I Do Best (song) =

Single by Robin S.

from the album Show Me Love
- B-side: "Show Me Love" (remix)
- Released: November 22, 1993
- Genre: Pop; R&B; soul
- Length: 4:21
- Label: Champion; Big Beat
- Songwriters: Frank Wildhorn; Jack Murphy
- Producer: Nick Martinelli

Robin S. singles chronology
"Luv 4 Luv" (1993)	"What I Do Best" (1993)	"I Want to Thank You" (1994)

"What I Do Best" is a song by American singer Robin S., released in November 1993 by Big Beat Records as the third single from her debut album, Show Me Love (1993). It is written by Frank Wildhorn and Jack Murphy, and produced by Nick Martinelli. A moderate hit in Europe, it reached the top 30 in the Netherlands, peaking at number 21. Additionally, it became a top-40 hit in Belgium and a top-50 hit in the UK. The single release featured remixes of "Show Me Love".

== Critical reception ==
J.D. Considine from The Baltimore Sun complimented the "luscious balladry" of "What I Do Best". Larry Flick from Billboard magazine wrote, "A wise single choice after the disappointing response to the 'Show Me Love' sound-alike, 'Love 4 Love'. Robin gets a nice chance to showcase her delicious alto range on this sweeping pop/R&B ballad." He added that producer Nick Martinelli has constructed a track "that swirls and builds to an appropriately dramatic climax. Should easily pump new blood into Robin's noteworthy debut album on the pop tip, while forging a promising relationship at urban level." M.R. Martinez from Cashbox stated, "It's all about the voice. The girl can find a way to play with a lyric."

Rod Edwards from the Gavin Report felt the singer "shows off her versatility on this heartwarming ballad", and added that the slow tempo "provides the perfect setting for this declaration of love, and will win the approval of even Robin's club-based audiences. This one is appropriate for that special candlelight dinner you've been planning." Maria Jimenez from Music & Media wrote, "The club mix represents a sound which has now become widely accepted, far beyond the clubs, and it translates easily to radio. The original mix is a slow, warm and soulful track demonstrating the singer's versatility. Two nice mixes which are basically two different songs." Alan Jones from Music Week gave it a score of four out of five, stating that "serene and assured, Robin S. puts her all into a powerful, sweet ballad that is guaranteed to follow in the Top 20 footsteps of 'Show Me Love' and 'Luv 4 Luv'."

== Track listings ==
- CD single, UK (1993)
1. "What I Do Best" (radio mix) – 4:27
2. "What I Do Best" (Work mix) – 6:07
3. "Show Me Love" (Stone's club mix) – 7:50
4. "Show Me Love" (Kerri's Madhouse mix) – 6:12
- CD maxi, Germany (1993)
1. "What I Do Best" (radio mix) – 4:21
2. "What I Do Best" (Work mix) – 6:00
- CD maxi, Netherlands (1993)
1. "What I Do Best" (radio mix) – 4:21
2. "What I Do Best" (Work mix) – 6:02
3. "Show Me Love" (Stone club mix) – 7:42
4. "Show Me Love" (Kerri's Madhouse mix) – 6:12

== Charts ==
Chart (1993–1994)	Peak position
Belgium (Ultratop 50 Flanders)	36
Europe (European Dance Radio)	7
Iceland (Íslenski Listinn Topp 40)	26
Netherlands (Dutch Top 40)	21
Netherlands (Single Top 100)	23
UK Singles (Official Charts)	43
UK Club Chart (Music Week)	46
US Bubbling Under Hot 100 (Billboard)	12
