= Who's Foolin' Who (One Way album) =

Studio album by One Way
- Released: 1982
- Recorded: 1982
- Studio: United Sound Systems (Detroit)
- Genre: R&B; funk; soul
- Length: 37:36
- Label: MCA Records
- Producer: ADK and Irene Perkins

One Way chronology
Fancy Dancer (1981)	Who's Foolin' Who (1982)	Wild Night (1982)

Who's Foolin' Who is a 1982 album by the R&B band One Way.

== Reception ==
Professional ratings
Review scores
Source	Rating
AllMusic	3/5 stars

The album includes the band's highest chart appearance in the United States, "Cutie Pie", which peaked at #61 on the Hot 100 (the band's only foray onto the Hot 100), #29 on the dance charts, and #4 on the R&B charts. The album's title track, "Who's Foolin' Who" was also released as the lead single, peaking at number 34 on the R&B chart. It did best in South Africa, where it reached number seven. "Who's Foolin' Who" has been covered by the Eurodance band, Double You on their 1992 album We All Need Love.

The album itself peaked #51 on the Billboard 200 and #8 on the R&B charts. Aside from 1984's #1 R&B album, Lady, this album is the highest charting in their seven-year run.

Incidentally, former One Way vocalist Alicia Myers released a solo album that same year (1982) entitled I Fooled You this Time. It is unclear which album (Myers' or this one) was recorded first, but evidently, the similarity in album titles was intentional. Specifically, if her album was released first, then One Way's album title Who's Foolin' Who can be seen as a sort of "response" to her album, or vice versa. The songs on Myers' album were written and produced by One Way bandmembers, so apparently, the whole sequence of events was tongue-in-cheek, and there was no animosity between the two camps.

== Track listing ==
1. "Cutie Pie" 5:25
2. "Sweet Lady" 3:40
3. "You" 4:41
4. "You're So Very Special" 4:57
5. "Who's Foolin' Who" 5:13
6. "Age Ain't Nothing But a Number" 3:47
7. "Give Me One More Chance" 4:47
8. "Runnin' Away" 5:10

Bonus tracks from other One Way albums appeared on the Japan import CD version of this album, released in 1993 ("Pull/Fancy Dancer" from 1981's Fancy Dancer and "Let's Talk About Sex" from 1985's Wrap Your Body).

== Personnel ==
=== One Way ===
- Al Hudson: Percussion, Lead and Backing vocals
- Dave Roberson: Guitar, Lead and Background vocals, Vibes, Keyboard
- Kevin McCord: Bass guitar, Lead and Background vocals, Linn, Keyboard
- Cortez Harris: Lead guitar, Lead and Background vocals
- Candyce Edwards: Lead and Background vocals
- Gregory Green: Drums, Percussions (sic)
- Jonathan "Corky" Meadows: Keyboards and Prophet-Five

=== Additional musician ===
- Maurice Davis: Horns

== Charts ==
=== Weekly charts ===
Chart (1982)	Peak position
US Billboard 200	51
US Top R&B/Hip-Hop Albums (Billboard)	8

=== Year-end charts ===
Chart (1982)	Position
US Top R&B/Hip-Hop Albums (Billboard)	31

=== Singles ===
Year	Single	Chart positions			
Year	Single	SA	US	US R&B	US Dance
1982	"Who's Foolin' Who"	7	—	34	—
1982	"Cutie Pie"	—	61	4	29
1982	"Runnin' Away"	—	—	83	—
