= Cutie Pie =

Single by One Way

from the album Who's Foolin' Who
- B-side: "Give Me One More Chance"
- Released: May 1982
- Genre: Funk, R&B
- Length: 5:28
- Label: MCA
- Songwriters: Al Hudson, Dave Roberson, George Morgan, Jonathan "Corky" Meadows, Terence Dudley
- Producers: ADK, Irene Perkins

One Way singles chronology
"Who's Foolin' Who" (1982)	"Cutie Pie" (1982)	"Runnin' Away" (1982)

"Cutie Pie" is a song performed by One Way, issued as the second single from their album Who's Foolin' Who. The song was the band's only appearance on the Billboard Hot 100, peaking at #61 in 1982.

It was used on the 2013 game Grand Theft Auto 5 for the radio station called Space 103.2.

The song was also featured prominently on the series premiere of Snowfall, and its spinoff, The Drop: A Snowfall Saga.

== Chart positions ==
Chart (1982)	Peak position
US Billboard Hot 100	61
US Hot Dance Music/Club Play Singles (Billboard)	29
US Hot Soul Singles (Billboard)	4
