= Bad Habits (Jenny Burton song) =

Single by Jenny Burton

from the album Jenny Burton
- B-side: "Let's Get Back to Love"
- Released: 1985
- Length: 5:32
- Label: Atlantic
- Songwriter(s): Allen George, Fred McFarlane
- Producer(s): Allen George, Fred McFarlane

Jenny Burton singles chronology
| "Strangers in a Strange World" (1984) | "Bad Habits" (1985) | "Dancing for My Love" (1985) |

"Bad Habits" is 1985 crossover dance single by Jenny Burton, former lead singer of the group C-Bank. The single went to number one on the US dance chart and remained on the chart for eleven weeks. It also peaked at number nineteen on the Billboard Hot Soul Singles chart and number 68 on the UK Singles Chart.

== Cover versions ==
The song was covered by ATFC presents OnePhatDeeva titled "Bad Habit" on Defected Records. It reached number 17 on the UK Singles Chart in September 2000.
