= Show Me Love (album) =

Studio album by Robin S.
- Released: June 21, 1993
- Genre: R&B; house; dance-pop
- Length: 65:44
- Label: Big Beat; Atlantic
- Producer: Allen George; La La; Nick Martinelli; Fred McFarlane; David Morales; StoneBridge; Matt Thomas; Junior Vasquez; Zan

Robin S. chronology
Show Me Love (1993)	From Now On (1997)

Singles from Show Me Love
- 1. "Show Me Love" Released: October 13, 1990; 2. "Luv 4 Luv" Released: July 19, 1993; 3. "What I Do Best" Released: November 22, 1993; 4. "I Want To Thank You" Released: 1993; 5. "Back It Up" Released: 1994

Show Me Love is the debut album by American singer Robin S., released on June 21, 1993. It includes the single "Show Me Love" which reached No. 5 on the US Billboard Hot 100, No. 6 in the UK Singles Chart and the top 10 of many other charts around the world. Further singles that were released from the album are "Luv 4 Luv" (titled "Love for Love" on the album), which reached No. 53 in the US and No. 11 in the UK, "What I Do Best" (UK No. 43), "I Want to Thank You" (UK No. 48) and "Back It Up" (UK No. 43).

== Critical reception ==
Professional ratings
Review scores
Source	Rating
AllMusic	4/5 stars
Robert Christgau	(choice cut)
Melody Maker	(mixed)
Philadelphia Daily News	2/4 stars

AllMusic editor Alex Henderson named the album "one of 1993's more memorable R&B/dance music collections", complimenting Robin S. as "a sassy, big-voiced belter who knows how to make sparks fly". He added further, "The success of her sleek yet gritty hits "Show Me Love" and "Back It Up" led many to think of Robin as a dance-floor diva. But as much as she excels in that area, "My Kind of Man" and "I'm Gonna Love You Right (Tonight)" demonstrate that she has no problem handling the silkiest of slow jams." J.D. Considine from The Baltimore Sun wrote, "Because dance music is usually judged on a single-by-single basis, few house divas ever have much success on the album end of things. Robin S. may prove an exception to that rule." He picked the "stomping, bass-driven" "Show Me Love" and the "equally danceable" "Love for Love" as the "best moments" on the album. He also highlighted the "luscious balladry" of "What I Do Best" and the "gospel-inflected intensity" of "Who's Gonna Raise the Child". Chuck Arnold from Philadelphia Daily News opined that of the dance cuts on the album, "only "Show Me Love" and the spiritual stomper "I Want to Thank You" (co-produced by fierce New York club DJ Junior Vasquez) hold up at home."

== Track listing ==
No.	Title	Writer(s)	Length
1.	"Show Me Love"	Allan George; Fred McFarlane	4:29
2.	"Love for Love"	George; McFarlane	4:15
3.	"I'm Gonna Love You Right (Tonight)"	George; McFarlane; Dana Reed	4:39
4.	"If We Could Just Be Friends"	William A. Aquart Jr.	4:32
5.	"What I Do Best"	Frank Wildhorn; Jack Murphy	4:22
6.	"My Kind of Man"	La La	5:18
7.	"I Want to Thank You"	Kevin McCord	4:04
8.	"Once in a Lifetime Love"	Michael O'Hara; Denise Rich; George Lyter	3:41
9.	"Back It Up"	George; McFarlane; Stonebridge	4:24
10.	"Back and Forth"	George; McFarlane; Matt Thomas	4:44
11.	"Brighter Day"	George; StoneBridge	4:26
12.	"Who's Gonna Raise the Child"	George; Reed	5:04
13.	"When You Find Love"	George; Reed	4:02
14.	"Show Me Love" (Extended Mix)	George; McFarlane	7:44

== Personnel ==
Adapted from AllMusic.

- Scott Alspach – drum programming
- Elizabeth Barrett – art direction
- Poogie Bell – drums
- Roger Byrum – saxophone
- Mike Cantwell – guitar
- Joe Carvello – executive producer
- Debbie Cole – backing vocals
- Nat Foster – engineer
- Welcome Bienvenue – mixing assistant engineer
- Ray Gaskins – saxophone
- Allan George – engineer, executive producer, producer
- Ivan Hampton – drums
- George Holz – photography
- Paul Jackson Jr. – guest artist, guitar
- Craig Kallman – executive producer
- La La – producer
- Ron Long – bass
- Luci Martin – background vocals
- Nick Martinelli – mixing, producer
- Fred McFarlane – executive producer, keyboards, producer
- Kim Miller – backing vocals
- P. Dennis Mitchell – engineer, mixing
- David Morales – mixing, producer
- Joey Moskowitz – keyboards
- Jay Oliver – keyboards
- Dana Reed – guitar, backing vocals
- Robin S. – primary artist, vocals, backing vocals
- Ralph Rolle – drums
- Vivian Sessoms – backing vocals
- StoneBridge – keyboards, mixing, producer
- David Sussman – engineer
- Dennis Taylor – backing vocals
- Matt Thomas – keyboards, producer
- Junior Vasquez – mixing, producer
- Bruce Weeden – engineer
- Zan – mixing, producer

== Charts ==
Chart (1993)	Peak position
Canadian Albums Chart	67
Dutch Albums Chart	20
German Albums Chart	84
UK Albums Chart	34
US Billboard 200	110
US Top R&B/Hip-Hop Albums	37
