= Mae Muller =

British singer (born 1997)

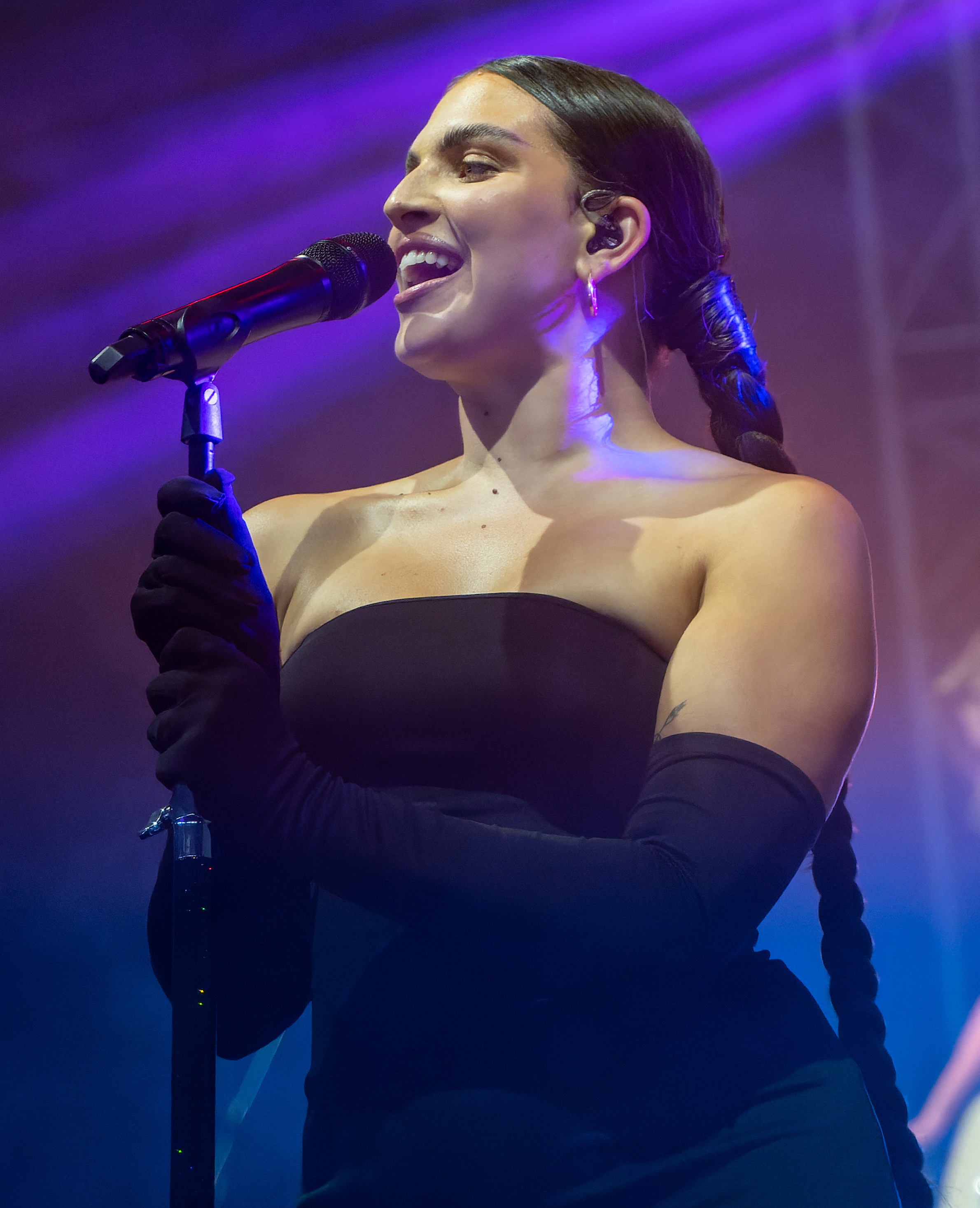
- Muller in 2022

Background information
- Born: Holly Mae Muller; 26 August 1997 (age 29)
- Origin: Kentish Town, London, England
- Genre: Pop
- Occupation: Singer
- Instrument: Vocals
- Years active: 2007; 2017–present
- Labels: Capitol; EMI; Universal
- Website: www.maemuller.com

Holly Mae Muller (born 26 August 1997) is an English singer. She rose to prominence in 2021 after releasing the single "Better Days", a collaboration with Swedish music collective Neiked and American rapper Polo G, which went on to chart in the top 40 in both the United Kingdom and United States. She represented the United Kingdom in the Eurovision Song Contest 2023 in Liverpool, with "I Wrote a Song". In the final, the song finished in 25th place with 24 points. She released her debut studio album Sorry I'm Late in September 2023.

== Career ==
=== 1997–2007: Early life and career beginnings ===
Muller was born in Kentish Town, London to Matt Muller and Nicola Jackson, who separated when she was six. Her aunt is the music video director Sophie Muller. Her paternal grandmother was actress Billie Whitelaw. Muller is Jewish and has stated that her grandfather, Robert Muller, fled from Nazi Germany to the UK when he was 12 years old.

Muller first began writing her own music at the age of eight and attended Fine Arts College in Belsize Park, North London. In 2007, as a child, she appeared in the music video for "Grace Kelly" by Mika, which was directed by her aunt, Sophie. Her strong family connections to the entertainment industry have led to some to describe her as a nepo baby.

=== 2017–2022: EP's, Chapter 1 and collaborations ===
While working at American Apparel and in a pub in Kentish Town, Muller began publicly performing. Muller asked a friend who knew how to use Logic to produce a few demos in exchange for a bottle of wine. She uploaded them to SoundCloud in 2017, and after sharing a video of her singing on Instagram, Muller was discovered and signed by her manager. Her debut extended play, After Hours, was released in February 2018, and was followed by the release of her second EP, Frankly, in September 2018. Muller signed to Capitol Records UK in the same year, However, she has since left her label in February 2024.

On 5 April 2019, Muller released her debut compilation album, Chapter 1. She then supported Little Mix on their 2019 LM5: The Tour. Following the tour, she released a single titled "Therapist", which she had performed on the tour.

Alongside the release of "Therapist", Muller also announced her first national tour, visiting five cities across the United Kingdom. In September 2020, she announced that her third EP would be released on 6 November 2020. The EP, titled No One Else, Not Even You, was supported by a headline tour across the United Kingdom and Europe.

In 2021, Muller appeared as guest vocalist on "When You're Out" with Billen Ted. She then joined the Swedish artist collective Neiked and the American rapper Polo G on the single "Better Days", a song which was a new entry at number 57 on the Billboard Hot 100 chart of 30 October, later peaking at number 23. "Better Days" scored a Top 10 US Pop Airplay and also charted on the UK Singles Chart, reaching a peak position of number 32.

=== 2023–2025: Eurovision Song Contest, Sorry I'm Late and acting work ===
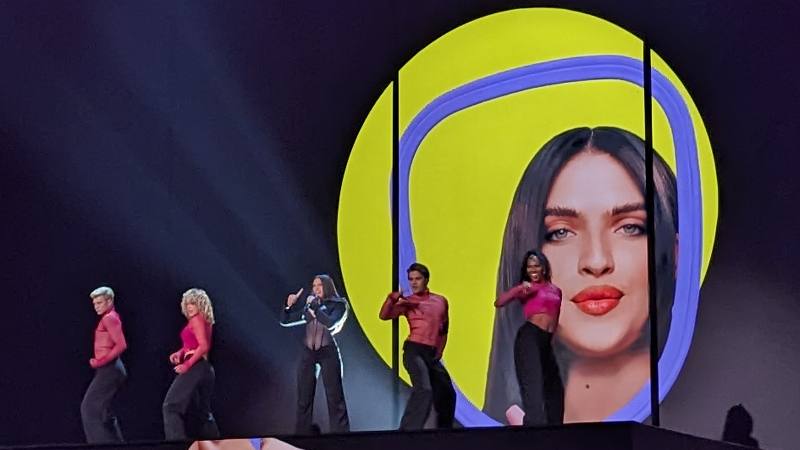
Muller performing at the Eurovision Song Contest 2023 in Liverpool, United Kingdom

On 3 March 2023, Muller released a collaboration with Sigala, Caity Baser and Stefflon Don, titled "Feels This Good". On 9 March 2023, she was announced as the UK's performer for the Eurovision Song Contest 2023 in Liverpool. Her entry, "I Wrote a Song", was released on the same day, accompanied by a music video. In the competition final on 13 May 2023, the song finished in 25th place out of 26 contestants with 24 points.

In May 2023, Muller announced her debut studio album Sorry I'm Late, which was released on 29 September 2023. Muller debuted in her first feature film in February 2024 as Kelly in Gassed Up, directed by George Amponsah.

In January 2024, Muller announced that she was taking a hiatus from her music career and that she had left her music label Capitol Records, becoming an independent artist.

In November 2024, Muller voiced Prancer in the film adaptation of The Night Before Christmas In Wonderland.

She released a single, Breakaway in March 2025, Then releasing the single 'Inside My Head' in June 2025. Followed by an EP 'My Island' in July 2025. This was her first release as an independent artist after leaving Capitol Records.

=== 2026: Return to a label and new releases ===
In April 2026, she released another single, 'Tell You That.' This was also a return to a label, with Muller signing with Tenance Records. She released 'Wheels Come Off' in July 2026.

She performed at Mighty Hoopla in June 2026.

== Artistry ==
Muller lists Gwen Stefani, Lily Allen, and Florence and the Machine amongst her musical influences. She grew up listening to her mother's favourite artists, including The Chicks, and Simon & Garfunkel. Muller described hearing Lily Allen's debut album, Alright, Still, as a pivotal moment for her.

== Personal life and political views ==
Ahead of Muller's participation in the Eurovision Song Contest, old tweets in which she claimed she "hated" the United Kingdom during the premiership of Boris Johnson resurfaced. She later acknowledged the posts "weren't ideal", especially when representing the country on the international stage, but added that that her success in the competition did not depend on her own nation anyway.

In 2025, over 70 past Eurovision participants, including Muller, signed an open letter to the European Broadcasting Union (EBU) demanding that Israel be banned from the contest, accusing the Israeli Public Broadcasting Corporation (IPBC/Kan), the country's participating broadcaster, of being "complicit in Israel’s genocide against the Palestinians in Gaza", referring to the humanitarian crisis caused by Israel's actions in the Gaza war.

== Discography ==
=== Studio albums ===
List of studio albums, with selected details and chart positions
Title	Album details	Peak chart positions	
Title	Album details	UK	SCO
Sorry I'm Late	Released: 29 September 2023; Label: Capitol, EMI, Universal; Format: CD, LP, digital download, streaming	33	13

=== Compilation albums ===
List of studio albums
Title	Details
Chapter 1	Released: 5 April 2019; Label: Capitol; Format: Digital download, streaming

=== Extended plays ===
List of extended plays
Title	Details
After Hours	Released: 16 February 2018; Label: Capitol; Format: Digital download
Frankly	Released: 7 December 2018; Label: Capitol; Format: Digital download
No One Else, Not Even You	Released: 6 November 2020; Label: Capitol; Format: CD, LP, digital download
My Island	Released: 18 July 2025; Label: Self-released; Format: Digital download, streaming

=== Singles ===
==== As lead artist ====
Title	Year	Peak chart positions									Certifications	Album
Title	Year	UK	AUS	IRE	ICE	LTU	NOR	NZ	SWE	US	Certifications	Album
"Close"	2018	—	—	—	—	—	—	—	—	—		Non-album single
"Jenny"	2018	—	—	—	—	—	—	—	—	—		Chapter 1
"The Hoodie Song"	2018	—	—	—	—	—	—	—	—	—		Chapter 1
"Pull Up"	2018	—	—	—	—	—	—	—	—	—		Chapter 1
"Busy Tone"	2018	—	—	—	—	—	—	—	—	—		Chapter 1
"Leave It Out"	2019	—	—	—	—	—	—	—	—	—		Chapter 1
"Anticlimax"	2019	—	—	—	—	—	—	—	—	—		Non-album singles
"Drama" (with Ms Banks and Caitlyn Scarlett)	2019	—	—	—	—	—	—	—	—	—		Non-album singles
"Dick"	2019	—	—	—	—	—	—	—	—	—		Non-album singles
"Therapist"	2020	—	—	—	—	—	—	—	—	—		Non-album singles
"I Don't Want Your Money"	2020	—	—	—	—	—	—	—	—	—		Non-album singles
"So Annoying"	2020	—	—	—	—	—	—	—	—	—		No One Else, Not Even You
"HFBD"	2020	—	—	—	—	—	—	—	—	—		No One Else, Not Even You
"Dependent"	2020	—	—	—	—	—	—	—	—	—		No One Else, Not Even You
"Better Days" (with Neiked and Polo G)	2021	32	16	20	—	52	29	13	78	23	BPI: Gold; ARIA: Platinum; RIAA: Platinum; RMNZ: Gold	Sorry I'm Late
"American Psycho" (with Marshmello and Trippie Redd)	2022	—	—	—	—	—	—	—	—	—		Non-album single
"I Just Came to Dance"	2022	—	—	—	—	—	—	—	—	—		Sorry I'm Late
"Feels This Good" (with Sigala and Caity Baser featuring Stefflon Don)	2023	93	—	—	—	—	—	—	—	—		Every Cloud – Silver Linings & Sorry I'm Late... Again
"I Wrote a Song"	2023	9	—	44	24	23	—	—	— (Note: "I Wrote a Song" did not enter the Swedish Singellista Chart, but peaked at number 10 on the Swedish Heatseeker Chart.)	—	BPI: Silver	Sorry I'm Late
"Me, Myself & I"	2023	— (Note: "Me, Myself & I" did not enter the official UK Singles Chart, but peaked at No. 41 on the UK Singles Downloads Chart and No. 43 on the UK Singles Sales Chart.)	—	—	—	—	—	—	—	—		Sorry I'm Late
"Nervous (In A Good Way)"	2023	—	—	—	—	—	—	—	—	—		Sorry I'm Late
"MJTL (Maybe That's Just Life)"	2023	—	—	—	—	—	—	—	—	—		Sorry I'm Late
"Written by a Woman"	2023	—	—	—	—	—	—	—	—	—		Sorry I'm Late
"Breakaway"	2025	—	—	—	—	—	—	—	—	—		My Island
"In My Head"	2025	—	—	—	—	—	—	—	—	—		My Island
"Tell You That"	2026	—	—	—	*	—	—	—	—	—		Non-album singles
"Wheels Come Off"	2026	—	—	—	*	—	—	—	—	—		Non-album singles
"Better Already" (with Wolf Cutt)	2026	—	—	—	*	—	—	—	—	—		Non-album singles
"Hallucination" (with Jodie Harsh)	2026	—	—	—	*	—	—	—	—	—		Non-album singles
"—" denotes a recording that did not chart or was not released in that territory. "*" denotes that the chart did not exist at that time.

==== As featured artist ====
Title	Year	Album
"Lil Rich" (Bren Joy featuring Mae Muller)	2021	Non-album singles
"I Did It" (Big Zuu featuring Mae Muller)	2021	Non-album singles
"When You're Out" (Billen Ted featuring Mae Muller)	2021	Non-album singles
"Love Hurt Repeat" (Alle Farben and Lewis Thompson featuring Mae Muller)	2024	Non-album singles

==== Promotional singles ====
Title	Year	Album
"Maybe" (acoustic)	2019	Non-album singles
"Gone"	2021	Non-album singles
"As It Was"	2023	Non-album singles
"MTJL"	2023	Sorry I'm Late
"Written by a Woman"	2023	Sorry I'm Late

== Notes ==
Preceded by Sam Ryder with "Space Man"	United Kingdom in the Eurovision Song Contest; 2023	Succeeded by Olly Alexander with "Dizzy"
