= Caity Baser =

English singer

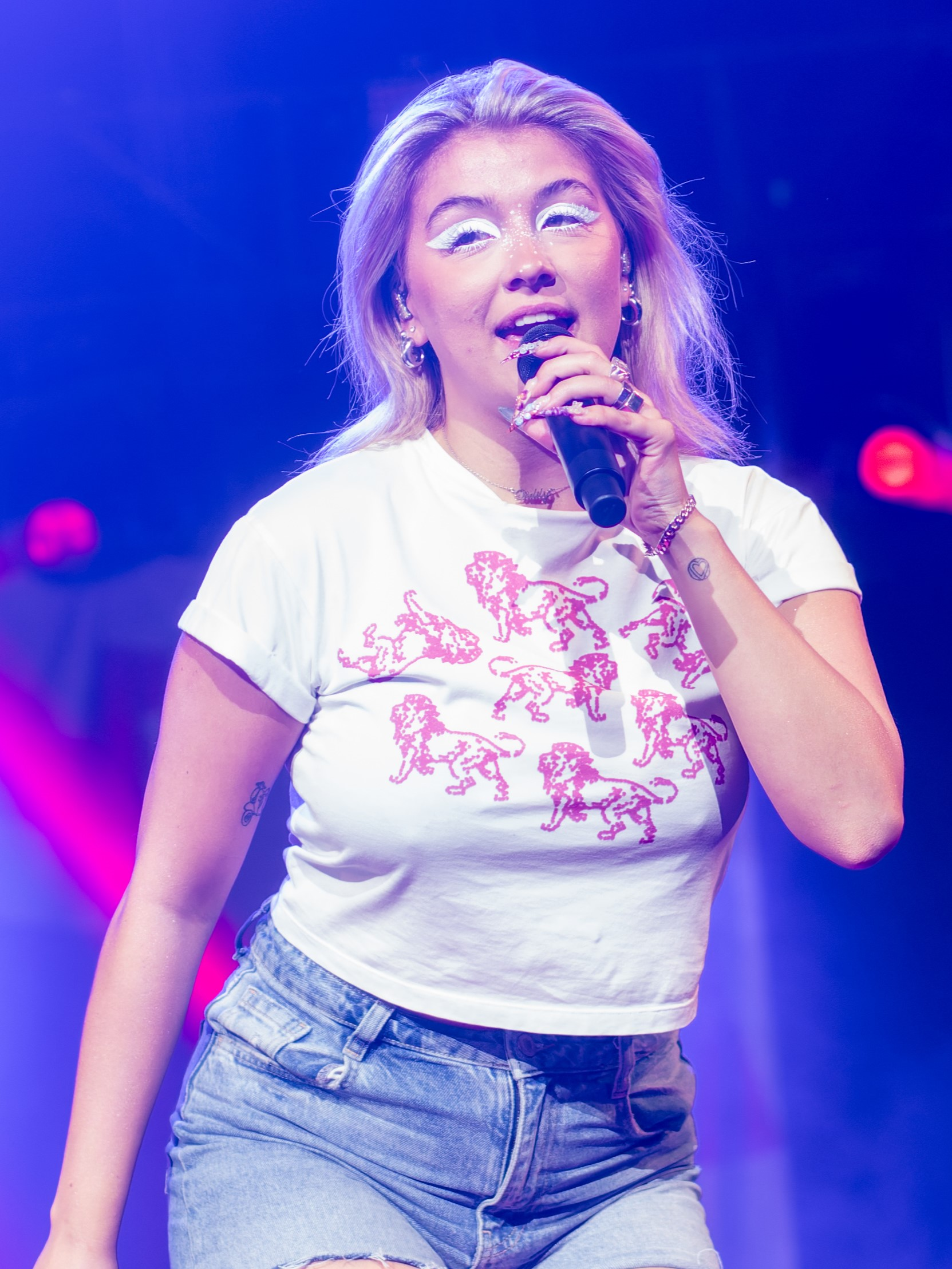
- Baser performing in 2024

Background information
- Born: Caity Baser; 7 July 2002 (age 24); Southampton, England
- Genres: Pop
- Occupation: Singer-songwriter
- Labels: Chosen Music, EMI Records
- Member of: Loud LDN
- Website: www.caitybaser.com

Caity Baser (born 7 July 2002) is an English singer-songwriter from Southampton, based in Brighton. She has had four entries on the UK Singles Chart; "X & Y", which charted at No. 91, "Pretty Boys", which peaked at number 26, "Feels This Good", a Sigala feature which also featured Mae Muller and Stefflon Don, which peaked at number 93 and "Dance Around It" with Joel Corry, which peaked at number 61. She is also a member of Loud LDN.

== Early and personal life ==
Baser was born in Southampton, educated at Thornden School and Richard Taunton Sixth Form College, and is currently based in Brighton.

== Career ==
=== 2020–2021: Beginnings ===
Baser started posting videos to TikTok during the first UK lockdown, following an epiphany that she did not care what other people thought of her music. In August 2020, she released "Average Student", a song about feeling lost in life, which acquired 1,000,000 views on TikTok, which prompted a management agency to direct message her and invite her to a London studio to meet the producers Future Cut. The day before, she had just worked one shift at The Co-operative Food, which she had taken in order to save money for studio sessions, and the experience caused her to cry her way through her second shift and leave the job on her third. "Average Student" was released on Spotify on 19 March 2021.

Three subsequent singles, "Haters", "Say It Like That", and "Slut Shaming", were released on 2 April, 7 May, and 28 May 2021. "Slut Shaming" was written in a branch of McDonald's over chicken mayos after a friend starting telling her about a girl who had laid into her for sleeping with a particular boy. Her four singles appeared on her mixtape Lil CB on 2 July 2021, and a further single, "Virtually", was released on 28 January 2022.

=== 2022–2023: Thanks for Nothing, See You Later ===
On 25 March 2022, she released "Friendly Sex", a song about ending a friendship with benefits after developing feelings for the friend. She told Notion magazine that it was the fastest song she had created to that point, and that she wrote it whilst cleaning her room. The melody came to her in the shower. The song attracted 6,000,000 streams on Spotify, and has seen use in TikTok videos. A follow-up, "Friendly Sex (Angrier)", was released on 2 May 2022, and was written after she developed contempt for the friend.

On 12 August 2022, she released the single "X&Y", which was about a non-relationship romantic investment; the song entered the UK Singles Chart at No. 76 the following week, where it peaked. A subsequent version, "X&Y (What I Didn't Say)", was released on 16 September 2022, and explored the sadness she felt as a result of the end of the attachment. On 24 November 2022, she released "Kiss You", a song about pining for a crush; a music video was released the same day. A subsequent version, "Kiss You, Pt. 2", was released on 30 December 2022. On 13 January 2023, she released "2020s", which has been described as a "a tour through her "claustrophobic" day-to-day worries".

Her debut EP, Thanks for Nothing, See You Never was released in February 2023, and NME described her as "position[ing] herself as a genuine personality with wit and energy to spare. [...] However, the EP's production doesn't quite match her gleaming personality." The EP spent a week on the UK Album Downloads Chart at No. 90. One track on the EP, "Pretty Boys", was written in November 2022, was playlisted by BBC Radio 1, and peaked at number 26 on the UK Singles Chart. On 1 March 2023, she featured on Radio 1's Future Artists with Jack Saunders.

=== 2023–present: Later releases ===
On 3 March 2023, she teamed up with Mae Muller and Stefflon Don on the Sigala track "Feels This Good"; it peaked at number 93 on the UK Singles Chart. On 12 May 2023, she featured on Joel Corry's "Dance Around It", which Corry had previously played in his live sets, and which charted at No. 61 on the UK Singles Chart. On 14 June 2023, she released "Leave Me Alone".

Baser caused controversy in June 2026 after performing a set at the YouthBeatz festival in Dumfries which was reported to contain multiple expletives and sexual references, despite the young age of the audience. Baser later said she had been told by festival organisers that she would not be required to "censor" her set.

== Artistry ==
Baser performed at Reading and Leeds Festival in 2022 on the BBC Introducing stage, a performance that NME described as "a display of pop brilliance by a force of charisma". In January 2023, it was announced that for her first headline tour, starting in April 2023, she would be capping ticket prices at £15, following an incident where she missed out on an Ed Sheeran gig that all her friends went to because she couldn't afford to go. She became a member of Loud LDN, a collective of London-based women and non-binary artists set up in May 2022, that year. She stated in January 2023 that she took inspiration from Etta James, Billie Holiday, the Carpenters, Fleetwood Mac, Iron Maiden, and Rizzle Kicks.

== Discography ==
=== Mixtapes ===
- Lil CB (2021)
- Still Learning (2024)

=== EPs ===
- Thanks for Nothing, See You Never (2023)
- There, I Said It (2025)
- Super Silly Sexy Sassy Stunning Summer (2026)

=== Singles ===
List of charting singles, with selected chart positions
Title	Year	Peak chart positions		Certifications	Album
Title	Year	UK	IRE	Certifications	Album
"Average Student"	2021	—	—		Lil CB
"Haters"	2021	—	—		Lil CB
"Say It Like That"	2021	—	—		Lil CB
"Slut Shaming"	2021	—	—		Lil CB
"Virtually"	2022	—	—		Non-album singles
"Friendly Sex"	2022	—	—		Non-album singles
"X&Y"	2022	77	—		Thanks for Nothing, See You Never
"Kiss You"	2022	—	—		Thanks for Nothing, See You Never
"2020s"	2023	—	—		Thanks for Nothing, See You Never
"Pretty Boys"	2023	26	55	BPI: Silver	Thanks for Nothing, See You Never
"Feels This Good" (with Sigala and Mae Muller featuring Stefflon Don)	2023	93	—		Every Cloud – Silver Linings & Sorry I'm Late
"Dance Around It" (with Joel Corry)	2023	61	79		Another Friday Night
"Leave Me Alone"	2023	—	—		Non-album single
"Why Can't I Have Two? (2468)"	2023	—	—		Still Learning
"Disco Shoes"	2023	—	—		Non-album single
"I Love Making Bad Boys Cry"	2023	—	—		Still Learning
"I'm a Problem"	2024	—	—		Still Learning
"Watch That Girl (She's Gonna Say It)"	2025	—	—		There, I Said It
"Running From Myself"	2025	—	—		Non-album single
"The Story of Her"	2025	—	—		There, I Said It
"The Weight of You (I'm Glad You Died)"	2025	—	—		There, I Said It
"Holiday Song"	2026	—	—		Super Silly Sexy Sassy Stunning Summer
"Where's My Bikini"	2026	—	—		Super Silly Sexy Sassy Stunning Summer
"Flaunt It"	2026	—	—		Super Silly Sexy Sassy Stunning Summer
"Best Night of My Life"	2026	—	—		Super Silly Sexy Sassy Stunning Summer

== Awards and nominations ==
Award	Year	Nominated work	Category	Result	Ref.
BBC Sound of...	2023	Herself	Sound of 2024	Nominated	
Brit Awards	2023	Herself	Rising Star	Nominated	
