= From Now On (Robin S. album) =

Studio album by Robin S.
- Released: June 3, 1997
- Length: 72:21
- Label: Big Beat; Atlantic
- Producer: Wayne Cohen; Steve Dubin; King Britt; Eric Miller; Tony Moran; Todd Terry; Darin Whittington; John Wicks; Bryce Wilson

Robin S. chronology
Show Me Love (1993)	From Now On (1997)

From Now On is the second album by American singer Robin S., released in 1997. It includes the single "It Must Be Love", which reached No. 91 on the US Billboard Hot 100, number one on the Dance Club Songs chart and No. 35 on the Hot R&B/Hip-Hop Songs chart. "It Must Be Love" was also released in the United Kingdom, where it peaked at No. 37 in the UK Singles Chart. From Now On remains the last studio album by Robin S. to date.

== Critical reception ==
Professional ratings
Review scores
Source	Rating
AllMusic	4/5 stars
Entertainment Weekly	A−
Music Week	4/5 stars

In a review for AllMusic, Leo Stanley commented that From Now On "is nearly as accomplished as her debut Show Me Love, thanks to her wonderful voice and the sleek, disco-styled production." He went on to say that "the songs can tend to sound a little similar to each other", but that the album "is infectious and irresistible when at its best." William Stevenson from Entertainment Weekly stated that the singer "outdoes herself here. The disco-style "It Must Be Love" is just one of the CD's danceable tracks. She also lets 'er rip on "Midnight" and "Shine on Me." Except for a few forgettable slow tunes, On energizes like a Power Bar." British magazine Music Week also gave it four out of five, adding that Robin S. "employs her scintillating soul vocal skills on 13 quality tracks, aided by some top notch musicianship."

== Track listing ==
No.	Title	Writer(s)	Length
1.	"It Must Be Love"	John Footman; Judy Wieder	4:50
2.	"Been So Long"	Andrea Martin; Greg Smith	4:17
3.	"You Know How to Love Me"	Reggie Lucas; James Mtume	6:07
4.	"Midnight"	Alison Moyet	4:32
5.	"There Is a Need"	Darin Whittington	5:11
6.	"Givin' U All That I've Got"	Robin S.; Todd Terry	4:04
7.	"Shine on Me"	Robin S.; Michael O'Hara	6:45
8.	"It's Not Enough"	Steve Dubin; Martin	4:31
9.	"24 Hour Love"	Wayne Cohen; Sheppard Solomon	3:44
10.	"All I Do"	Stevie Wonder; Morris Broadnax; Clarence Paul	5:04
11.	"We're in This Together"	O'Hara; Stephen Nikolas; Brendon Sibley	4:56
12.	"It Must Be Love" (Johnick Henry St. Mix)	Footman; J. Wieder	7:53
13.	"It Must Be Love" (Fitch Bros. Club Mix)	Footman; Wieder	9:38

Note

- Tracks 12 and 13 available on CD only.

== Charts ==
Chart (1997)	Peak position
US Top R&B/Hip-Hop Albums	79
