= Better Days (Neiked, Mae Muller and Polo G song) =

2021 song by Neiked, Mae Muller and Polo G

Single by Neiked, Mae Muller and Polo G (Note: Polo G is credited as a featured artist on Regard remix release and he is absent on acoustic rendition of single.)
- Released: 24 September 2021
- Genre: Nu-disco; pop; funk
- Length: 2:40
- Label: Capitol; EMI
- Songwriters: Karl Ivert; Kian Sang; Neiked; Polo G; Von Tiger
- Producer: Neiked

Neiked singles chronology
"Sometimes" (2019)	"Better Days" (2021)	"I Just Called" (2022)

Mae Muller singles chronology
"Gone" (2021)	"Better Days" (2021)	"American Psycho" (2022)

Polo G singles chronology
"Trenches (Remix)" (2021)	"Better Days" (2021)	"Last One Standing" / "Want It All" (2021)

J Balvin singles chronology
"Una Nota" (2021)	"Better Days" (2022)	"Niño Soñador" (2022)

Music video
- "Better Days" on YouTube

"Better Days" is a song by Swedish music collective Neiked, English singer Mae Muller and American rapper Polo G. It was released on 24 September 2021 via Capitol Records and EMI Records. The song was written by Karl Ivert, Kian Sang, Polo G, Von Tiger and Neiked, who also produced it. It also went viral on TikTok as part of the "Better Days challenge", which helped the song garner over one million streams. The song was later remixed by Colombian rapper J Balvin. The song was included on Muller's debut studio album, Sorry I'm Late, released in 2023.

== Composition ==
In a press release, Universal Music Canada described the song as "a dreamy, upbeat slice of pop perfection that is filled with joy and hope". Out Now felt that it is "a high-energy pop anthem whose optimistic outlook is undeniably catchy". The song is written in the key of E-flat major, with a tempo of 110 beats per minute.

== Music video ==
An accompanying music video was released on 7 October 2021, and directed by Tom Dream. It showcases the three artists "living in a retro world with Mae Muller taking center stage".

== Track listing and formats ==
Digital download / streaming

1. "Better Days" – 2:40

Digital download – Acoustic

1. "Better Days" (Acoustic) – 2:55

Streaming – Acoustic

1. "Better Days" (Acoustic) – 2:55
2. "Better Days" – 2:40

Digital download / streaming – Regard remix

1. "Better Days" (Regard Remix) – 2:46

Digital download / streaming – extended play

1. "Better Days" (with J Balvin) – 3:42
2. "Better Days" – 2:40
3. "Better Days" (Regard Remix) – 2:46
4. "Better Days" (Acoustic) – 2:55

== Credits and personnel ==
Credits adapted from AllMusic.

- Taurus Bartlett – vocals
- Elin Bergman – composer
- Clint Gibbs – mixing
- Karl Ivert – composer
- Mae Muller – primary artist, vocals
- Neiked – composer, primary artist, producer
- Polo G – composer, primary artist
- Victor Rådström – programming
- Kian Sang – composer

== Charts ==
=== Weekly charts ===
Weekly chart performance for "Better Days"
Chart (2021–2023)	Peak position
Australia (ARIA)	16
Belarus Airplay (TopHit)	93
Canada Hot 100 (Billboard)	23
Canada AC (Billboard)	35
Canada CHR/Top 40 (Billboard)	12
Canada Hot AC (Billboard)	16
CIS Airplay (TopHit)	15
Czech Republic Airplay (ČNS IFPI)	47
Denmark (Tracklisten)	28
Estonia Airplay (TopHit)	399
Global 200 (Billboard)	33
Greece International (IFPI)	55
Ireland (IRMA)	20
Kazakhstan Airplay (TopHit)	60
Lithuania (AGATA)	52
Mexico Airplay (Billboard)	34
Netherlands (Dutch Top 40)	30
Netherlands (Single Top 100)	49
New Zealand (Recorded Music NZ)	13
Norway (VG-lista)	29
Poland Airplay (ZPAV)	35
Portugal (AFP)	107
Romania Airplay (TopHit)	210
Russia Airplay (TopHit)	13
San Marino (SMRRTV Top 50)	42
Sweden (Sverigetopplistan)	78
Ukraine Airplay (TopHit)	117
UK Singles (OCC)	32
UK Hip Hop/R&B (OCC)	9
US Billboard Hot 100	23
US Adult Contemporary (Billboard)	21
US Adult Pop Airplay (Billboard)	11
US Dance/Mix Show Airplay (Billboard)	18
US Pop Airplay (Billboard)	10
US Rhythmic Airplay (Billboard)	22

=== Monthly charts ===
Monthly chart performance for "Whatever"
Chart (2022–2023)	Peak position
CIS Airplay (TopHit)	17
Kazakhstan Airplay (TopHit)	66
Russia Airplay (TopHit)	16

=== Year-end charts ===
2022 year-end chart performance for "Better Days"
Chart (2022)	Position
Australia (ARIA)	73
Canada (Canadian Hot 100)	55
CIS Airplay (TopHit)	82
Global 200 (Billboard)	184
Russia Airplay (TopHit)	92
US Billboard Hot 100	73
US Adult Top 40 (Billboard)	38
US Mainstream Top 40 (Billboard)	29

== Certifications ==
Certifications for "Better Days"
Region	Certification	Certified units/sales
Australia (ARIA)	Platinum	70,000^{‡}
Brazil (Pro-Música Brasil)	Platinum	40,000^{‡}
Canada (Music Canada)	Platinum	80,000^{‡}
Denmark (IFPI Danmark)	Gold	45,000^{‡}
New Zealand (RMNZ)	Platinum	30,000^{‡}
United Kingdom (BPI)	Gold	400,000^{‡}
United States (RIAA)	Platinum	1,000,000^{‡}
^{‡} Sales+streaming figures based on certification alone.

== Release history ==
Release history and versions for "Better Days"
Region	Date	Format(s)	Version	Label	Ref.
Various	24 September 2021	Digital download; streaming	Original	Capitol; EMI	
United States	26 October 2021	Contemporary hit radio	Original	Captiol	
United States	8 November 2021	Adult contemporary radio; hot adult contemporary radio; modern adult contemporary radio	Original	Captiol	
Various	19 November 2021	Digital download; streaming	Acoustic	Captiol	
Various	3 December 2021	Digital download; streaming	Regard remix	Captiol	
Italy	3 December 2021	Radio airplay	Original	Universal	
United States	11 January 2022	Rhythmic contemporary radio	Original	Capitol	
Various	28 January 2022	Digital download; streaming	EP	Capitol; EMI	
Italy	28 January 2022	Radio airplay	J Balvin remix	Universal	
