= I Just Called =

Single by Neiked, Anne-Marie and Latto
- Released: 27 May 2022
- Genre: Pop
- Length: 2:30
- Label: Asylum; Warner; Neiked Collective
- Songwriters: Neiked; Anne-Marie; Latto; Nicholas Aranda; Bekah Novi; Jae Stephens; Phillipe Dela Pena; Stevie Wonder; Von Mentzer
- Producers: De'La; Neiked; Von Mentzer

Neiked singles chronology
"Better Days" (2021)	"I Just Called" (2022)	"You're Hired" (2023)

Anne-Marie singles chronology
"Everywhere" (2021)	"I Just Called" (2022)	"Psycho" (2022)

Latto singles chronology
"Mind Yo' Business" (2022)	"I Just Called" (2022)	"Booty" (2022)

"I Just Called" is a song by Swedish duo Neiked, English singer Anne-Marie, and American rapper Latto. The song was released on 27 May 2022, through Asylum and Warner. The song interpolates Stevie Wonder's 1984 song "I Just Called to Say I Love You".

== Background ==
In an interview with Official Charts, Neiked said that Stevie Wonder heard "I Just Called" before its release and gave the song his approval.

== Music and lyrics ==
Anne-Marie sings about "moving on from her past partner and needing to get closure". However, she cannot do it face to face, so she says “I just called to say I hate you/I just called to say that I moved on.”

== Critical reception ==
The Musical Hype rated the song 4 out of 5 stars. He called it a "short, sweet, and utterly infectious pop bop". Alex Gonzalez of Uproxx wrote that "Anne-Marie and Latto ride the electronic beat with ease, displaying confidence in their craft as frontrunners in their respective genres."

== Charts ==
Chart performance for "I Just Called"
Chart (2022)	Peak position
Hungary (Rádiós Top 40)	25
New Zealand Hot Singles (RMNZ)	4
Swedish Heatseeker (Sverigetopplistan)	19
UK Singles (OCC)	99
