= Neiked =

Swedish artist collective

- Born: Stockholm, Sweden
- Origin: Gothenburg, Sweden
- Occupations: Singer; songwriter; record producer
- Years active: 2015–present
- Label: Neiked Collective
- Members: Victor Rådström; Mikael Rabus
- Website: neikedmusic.com

Neiked (stylised as NEIKED) is a Swedish artist collective of singers, songwriters and record producers. Victor Rådström and Mikael Rabus founded Neiked, a group that comprises rising artists, producers, writers and vocalists.

Rådström got his start writing songs in the basement of his home. Upon hearing his music, his friends were impressed by his creativity and encouraged him to reach out to various record labels in order to share his music with a larger audience. Impatient with the pace of the labels and with an eagerness to share the project with the world, Rådström and his friend and collaborator Rabus took matters into their own hands, formed the Neiked Collective, and released the music independently. The two of them are the founding parts of the independent label Neiked Collective. The collective has since appeared on shows such as BBC Live Lounge and on Scandinavian talk shows, showcasing the young producer's work in an unorthodox way.

Neiked's third single "Sexual" (2016) reached a peak position of number four on the Australian Singles Chart and number five on the UK Singles Chart. "Sexual" was influenced by Marvin Gaye's "Sexual Healing"; Rådström came up with the line "I'm feeling sexual so we should be sexual", with that thought forming the base of the song.

In 2018 they released the single "How Did I Find You" featuring Swedish singer and childhood friend Miriam Bryant, which features "a woozy, dusk-drenched pulse". Neiked released the single "Sometimes" in November 2019, which was called a "big and brassy declaration, [with] engaging production and west-coast warmth".

Neiked created the collaboration with Mae Muller and Polo G "Better Days" in 2021, a song which was a new entry at number 57 on the Billboard Hot 100 chart of October 30. "Better Days" also charted on the UK Singles Chart, debuting at number 52 on the chart of 4 November 2021 after accumulating a sales total of 8,007.

== Discography ==
=== Studio albums ===
- Best of Hard Drive (2019)

=== Singles ===
Title	Year	Peak chart positions										Certifications	Album
Title	Year	SWE	AUS	BEL (FL)	DEN	GER	IRE	NOR	NZ	UK	US	Certifications	Album
"Cowboy" (featuring Thomas Stenström)	2015	—	—	—	—	—	—	—	—	—	—		Best of Hard Drive
"Sand & Lead" (featuring Brolin)	2016	—	—	—	—	—	—	—	—	—	—		Best of Hard Drive
"Sexual" (featuring Dyo)	2016	32	4	7	16	43	2	9	6	5	—	ARIA: 3× Platinum; BEA: Platinum; BPI: 3× Platinum; BVMI: Gold; IFPI DEN: Platinum; IFPI NOR: Platinum; RMNZ: 3× Platinum	Best of Hard Drive
"Call Me" (featuring MIMI)	2017	50	—	—	—	—	63	—	— (Note: "Call Me" did not enter the NZ Top 40 Singles Chart, but peaked at number 10 on the NZ Heatseeker Singles Chart.)	55	—	BPI: Silver	Non-album single
"Old School Love" (featuring Shy Nodi)	2018	—	—	—	—	—	—	—	—	—	—		Best of Hard Drive
"Been a Long Time" (featuring Lil Indo)	2018	—	—	—	—	—	—	—	—	—	—		Best of Hard Drive
"How Did I Find You" (featuring Miriam Bryant)	2018	— (Note: "How Did I Find You" did not enter the Swedish Singellista Chart, but peaked at number one on the Swedish Heatseeker Chart.)	—	—	—	—	—	—	—	—	—		Best of Hard Drive
"Lifestyle" (featuring Husky)	2019	—	—	—	—	—	—	—	—	—	—		Best of Hard Drive
"Sometimes" (featuring Kes Kross and Jackson Penn)	2019	—	—	—	—	—	—	—	—	—	—		Non-album single
"Better Days" (with Mae Muller and Polo G)	2021	78	16	—	28	—	20	29	13	32	23	ARIA: Platinum; BPI: Gold; IFPI DEN: Gold; RIAA: Platinum; RMNZ: 2× Platinum	Sorry I'm Late
"I Just Called" (with Anne-Marie and Latto)	2022	— (Note: "I Just Called" did not enter the Swedish Singellista Chart, but peaked at number three on the Swedish Heatseeker Chart.)	—	—	—	—	—	—	— (Note: "I Just Called" did not enter the NZ Top 40 Singles Chart, but peaked at number 24 on the NZ Hot Singles Chart.)	99	—		Non-album singles
"You're Hired" (featuring Ayra Starr)	2023	—	—	—	—	—	—	—	—	—	—		Non-album singles
"The Moves" (featuring Nile Rodgers and Muni Long)	2024	—	—	—	—	—	—	—	—	—	—		Non-album singles
"Glide" (with Portugal. The Man)	2025	—	—	—	—	—	—	—	—	—	—		
"—" denotes a recording that did not chart or was not released in that territory.
