= Alicia Myers =

American R&B musician (born 1957)

- Born: November 20, 1957 (age 68); Detroit, Michigan, U.S.
- Genres: Contemporary R&B, dance-pop, funk, soul
- Occupations: Singer, songwriter
- Instrument: Vocals
- Years active: 1976–present
- Labels: MCA, Universal Special Products

Alicia Myers (born November 20, 1957) is an American R&B musician. Beginning her music career with the band Al Hudson & the Soul Partners, who later evolved into One Way, Myers went on to a moderately successful solo career in the early 1980s, scoring hits such as "I Want to Thank You", "Don't Stop What You're Doin'", and "You Get the Best from Me (Say, Say, Say)".

== Early life/Personal life ==
Myers was born on November 20, 1957, in Detroit, Michigan, to Lawrence and Margaret Myers, as one of their nine children. Her older brother, Jackie Myers, also a musician, would later become part of the beach band Chairmen of the Board. The two siblings competed in a local talent competition in April 1968 at Detroit's Martin Luther King Jr. High School, where they sang, "Ain't Nothing Like the Real Thing", originally performed by Marvin Gaye and Tammi Terrell, and they were awarded first place. She attended Lee University for her collegiate studies.

She is a survivor of childhood tuberculosis. She later survived breast cancer in 1998 and has since become an advocate for treatment against the disease.

== Music career ==
In 1978, she started her music career with Al Hudson & the Soul Partners. With Myers in the lineup, they released the album Happy Feet as Al Hudson and the Partners in 1979; this record includes the R&B hit "You Can Do It", co-penned by Myers and featuring her on lead vocals, which was a big club/disco hit. Soon thereafter, the group changed their name to One Way featuring Al Hudson and, eventually, simply One Way.

After her stint in the band, she started her solo music recording career in 1981, with the release of Alicia by MCA Records. This album achieved a Billboard magazine R&B Albums chart peak of No. 41 and featured two of her biggest hits, "I Want to Thank You" and "Don't Stop What You're Doin'".

Her follow-up album, Alicia Again, released later the same year, failed to chart. Her subsequent album, I Fooled You This Time appeared the following year under the same label, and it surpassed the R&B Album chart placement of Alicia, reaching number 27. The high charting success of I Fooled You can be attributed to the inclusion of the aforementioned "I Want To Thank You", which had gained popularity due to DJs such as Tee Scott playing it in heavy rotation, where it was discovered by those who missed it the previous year upon its initial release. Her fourth album, 1984's I Appreciate became her highest-charting album on the R&B chart, peaking at number 12, while also heralding her only appearance on The Billboard 200, where it peaked at No. 186. I Appreciate would be her last album of newly recorded material released in the 1980s.

Universal Special Products re-released her debut Alicia album, with the same exact track listing, as Don't Stop What You're Doin' in 1986, without further chart success.

In 2011, Myers released her first album of new material in 27 years, entitled Peace of Mind.

== Legacy ==
In 1990, the singer Harmony featured a cover of Myers' song "I Want to Thank You" on her 1990 album Let There Be Harmony. The following year, Mariah Carey sampled the same Myers tune on the song "Make It Happen" from her 1991 album Emotions, while Father MC sampled the song "Close to You" with background vocals by Kenny Greene of Intro on his 1992 album of the same name. Several years later, "I Want to Thank You" was again sampled by E-40 in his song "I Wanna Thank You" featuring Suga-T, taken from his 1996 album Tha Hall of Game. Also, Busta Rhymes and Q-Tip sampled the song for Busta's "Thank You" in 2013. It was later sampled again in 2019 by Chris Brown for his song "Temporary Lover", taken from his ninth album, Indigo, and in 2022 by the Weeknd for his song "Sacrifice", taken from his fifth album Dawn FM.

The song "If You Play Your Cards Right" from her debut album is covered often by several artist since its release; most recently by Syleena Johnson on her second album Chapter 2: The Voice. Chante Moore covered Myers’ song "I Want To Thank You" on her 1994 album A Love Supreme.

In October 2019, a mural by artist Stephen Powers was unveiled on Pier 40 in Manhattan, New York, featuring the words "I WANT TO THANK YOU," inspired by Myers' song.

== Discography ==
=== Studio albums ===
List of studio albums, with selected chart positions
Title	Album details	Peak chart positions	
Title	Album details	US	US R&B
Alicia	Released: 1981; Label: MCA; CD, digital download	—	41
Alicia Again	Released: 1981; Label: MCA; CD, digital download	—	—
I Fooled You This Time	Released: 1982; Label: MCA; CD, digital download	—	27
I Appreciate	Released: 1984; Label: MCA; CD, digital download	186	12
Peace of Mind	Released: 2011; Label: Love Town Music; CD, digital download	—	—
"—" denotes releases that did not chart or were not released in that territory.

=== Miscellaneous albums ===
- Don't Stop What You're Doin' (1986; re-release of Alicia album from 1981)

=== Singles ===
Year	Single	Chart positions			
Year	Single	US Pop	US R&B	US Dance	UK
1981	"Reservation for One"	—	—	—	—
1981	"Don't Stop What You're Doin' "	—	—	—	—
1981	"Do Your Kind of Dance"	—	—	—	—
1982	"I Want to Thank You"	—	37	—	—
1983	"Is It Really Real"	—	—	—	—
1984	"You Get the Best from Me"	105	5	5	58
1984	"Appreciation"	—	38	29	—
1985	"Just Can't Stay Away"	—	—	—	—
1995	"Goodthing"	—	—	—	—
2002	"A Good Thang"	—	—	—	—
2015	"Right Here Right Now"	—	—	—	—
"—" denotes releases that did not chart or were not released in that territory.
