= Fred McFarlane =

American songwriter

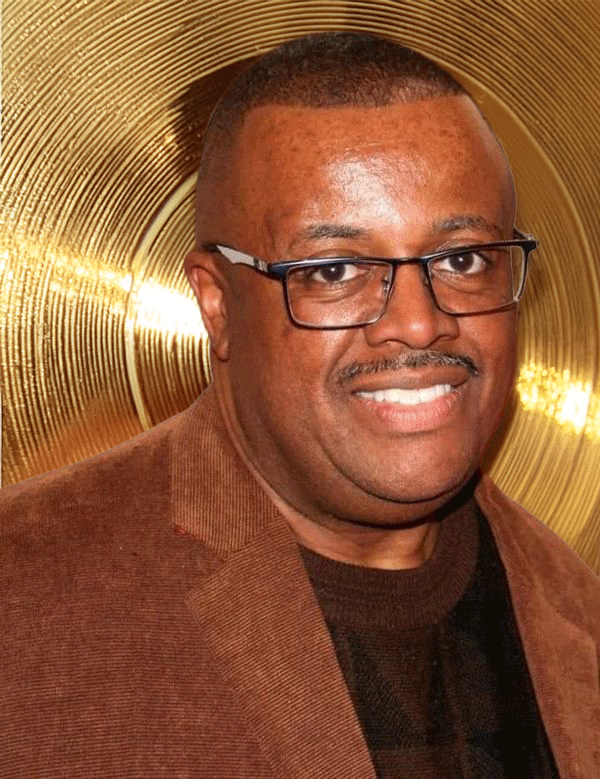

Background information
- Born: Frederick Craig McFarlane; November 14, 1959
- Died: September 3, 2016 (aged 56)
- Occupations: Record Producer, Songwriter, Multi-Instrumentalist, Arranger

Frederick Craig McFarlane (November 14, 1959 – September 3, 2016) was an American R&B songwriter, record producer and multi-instrumentalist. McFarlane's career as a songwriter and producer spanned more than 30 years. He wrote or co-wrote a number of R&B and dance hits including Jenny Burton's "Bad Habits" in 1985; Robin S.' 1993 debut single "Show Me Love" which he co-wrote with Allen George; and Jason Derulo's "Don't Wanna Go Home".

McFarlane began his professional career as a keyboardist, supporting such artists as Crown Heights Affair and Enchantment. He transitioned to producing during the 1980s. Among the songs he produced was Jocelyn Brown's 1984 hit "Somebody Else's Guy".

McFarlane also penned songs for dozens of other artists, including Will Downing, Force MDs, Evelyn "Champagne" King, Keith Sweat and Madonna.

McFarlane died in early September 2016. A cause of death was not released at the time.
