= Jenny Burton =

American female R&B singer

- Born: November 18, 1957; New York City, U.S.
- Genres: Freestyle, soul, dance-pop
- Occupations: Singer, songwriter
- Years active: 1975–present
- Label: Atlantic Records

Jenny Burton (born November 18, 1957, New York) is an American R&B singer who had several hits on the US Billboard dance chart.

== Career ==
She was lead singer of the dance music band C-Bank's 1983 top 5 Hot Dance Music/Club Play single "One More Shot", notable for record producer John Robie's use of a "non-linear" approach to its production.

In 1983 Burton went solo, releasing the album In Black and White also produced by Robie. This album featured the Top 20 single "Remember What You Like" and the club favorites "Players" and "Rock Steady," all released on Atlantic Records. She had her biggest success in 1984 with the release of her second self-titled album, featuring the #1 dance hit and #19 R&B single "Bad Habits". The track reached #24 in the Netherlands Single Top 100 and #68 in the UK Singles Chart in March 1985. Also in 1984 Burton sang two songs, "Strangers in a Strange World" and "It's Alright By Me", used on the soundtrack to the film Beat Street.

In the 1990s, having regrouped as an inspirational artist, Burton had a successful run at the New York venue Don't Tell Mama, with her band and group the Jenny Burton Experience. She was married to Broadway songwriter Peter Link.

Jenny Burton now focuses on gospel and inspirational music. Her last albums were released on Watchfire Records.

== Discography ==
=== Albums ===
- 1983: In Black and White
- 1985: Jenny Burton
- 1986: Souvenirs
- 2005: The Jenny Burton Experience
- 2007: I Think on These Things
- 2008: In Black and White (CD reissue)
- 2014: Jenny Burton (CD reissue including bonus tracks)
- 2014: The Best of Jenny Burton

=== Singles ===
Year	Song	US			BEL	NLD	UK	Album
Year	Song	Hot 100	Dance	R&B	BEL	NLD	UK	Album
1975	"(Nobody Loves Me) Like You Do"	—	17	—	—	—	—	single only
1982	"One More Shot" (with C-Bank)	—	5	87	—	—	—	single only
1983	"Remember What You Like"	81	10	21	—	—	—	In Black and White
1984	"Rock Steady"	—	40	88	—	—	—	In Black and White
1984	"Strangers in a Strange World" (with Patrick Jude)	54	—	—	—	—	—	Beat Street (soundtrack)
1985	"Bad Habits"	101	1	19	16	24	68	Jenny Burton
1985	"Dancing for My Love"	—	46	—	—	—	—	Jenny Burton
1985	"Love Runs Deeper than Pride"	—	—	—	—	—	—	Jenny Burton
1985	"People Have Got to Move" (split single with Lou Reed)	—	—	—	—	—	—	White Nights (soundtrack)
1986	"Do You Want It Bad Enuff"	—	—	68	—	—	—	Souvenirs
"—" denotes single that did not chart or was not released.

== See also ==
- List of Number 1 Dance Hits (United States)
- List of artists who reached number one on the US Dance chart
