= Robin S. =

American singer (born 1962)

- Born: Robin Jackson Stone; January 27, 1962 (age 64); Hempstead, New York, U.S.
- Genres: House; R&B; urban; dance-pop; gospel; jazz
- Occupation: Singer
- Instrument: Vocals
- Years active: 1990–present
- Labels: Big Beat; Atlantic; Humble Sound Records
- Website: iamrobins.com

Robin Jackson Maynard (née Stone; born January 27, 1962) is an American singer. She is best known for her 1992 debut single "Show Me Love", which peaked at number five on the Billboard Hot 100, as well as its follow-up, "Luv 4 Luv", which peaked at number 52. A house music recording artist, she has scored three number one singles on the Billboard Dance Club Songs chart.

== Biography ==
Robin S. released the original version of the single "Show Me Love" in 1990. The track was produced by Fred McFarlane and went on to become a moderate success. In 1993, the track was remixed by the Swedish DJ and producer StoneBridge and re-released under the artist name "Robin S." with Big Beat Records in 1993. This release climbed the charts the same year, as did her first album, also titled Show Me Love. The remixed version of "Show Me Love" peaked at No. 1 on the Hot Dance Music/Club Play, No. 1 on the Hot Dance Singles Sales, No. 7 on the Hot R&B/Hip-Hop Singles and Tracks and No. 5 on the Billboard Hot 100. It also peaked at No. 4 on the Rhythmic Top 40 chart. The success earned her a spot on the 1994 "American Music Awards" as a performer. The follow-up singles, "Luv 4 Luv" and "What I Do Best", saw similar success. As of 2004, the album Show Me Love had sold 303,000 copies in the US.

After taking time off to work on her songwriting, she began working with producers Eric "E-Smoove" Miller and Todd Terry on her second album. Released in 1997 on Atlantic Records, From Now On reflected broader interests for Robin S., encompassing Gospel and R&B ballads in addition to Hi-NRG dance-floor material. The album's first single, "It Must Be Love", became a hit, spending two weeks at No. 1 on the Hot Dance Club Play chart. It was also a moderate crossover hit on the Hot R&B/Hip-Hop Songs chart, peaking at No. 35, and a minor pop hit, peaking at No. 91 on the Billboard Hot 100. The follow-up single "Midnight" reached No. 1 on the Hot Dance Club Play, and got better success on the Billboard Top 100, peaking at No. 35. Robin S. performed the hit on the Ricki Lake show during the week the single hit Top 10 on the U.S. dance charts. She also appeared on the RuPaul show to promote From Now On; the album sold about 100,000 copies in the U.S. by the end of its album's chart run. "Midnight" was written by British singer Alison Moyet and it appears on the first Yazoo album, Upstairs at Eric's. In 1996 she did a song, "Givin You All That I Got", that was played in the movie Space Jam and was featured on the soundtrack.

Robin S. completed a successful European tour in 2004, where her music has historically found a larger audience. She has become a popular performer at 1990s-themed club/dance-pop concerts. As of early 2007, Robin S. was still recording though none of her new material has been released as she is seeking a new record label. Robin S. continued to perform on cruise liners in Europe and Asia.

In 2008, she recorded a new song with the European artist Honest. In October 2008, the radio mix of her 1993 song "Show Me Love" reached the top of the Dutch Top 40. That made it Robin S.'s most successful song in the Netherlands. In 2009, she recorded new song with Corey Gibbons, the single "At My Best".

In 2016, Robin S.'s collaboration with DJ Escape on the track, "Shout It Loud", went to number one on the US dance chart. In 2023, she signed with independent music label Humble Sound Records to release a series of new singles, and collaborations.

== Discography ==
=== Studio albums ===
Year	Album details	Peak chart positions					
Year	Album details	US	US R&B	CAN	GER	NLD	UK
1993	Show Me Love: Released: July 6, 1993; Label: Big Beat / Atlantic; Formats: CD, cassette	110	37	67	84	20	34
1997	From Now On: Released: June 3, 1997; Label: Big Beat / Atlantic; Formats: CD, cassette	—	79	—	—	—	—
"—" denotes releases that did not chart or were not released in that territory.

=== Singles ===
Year	Title	Peak chart positions										Certifications	Album
Year	Title	US	AUT	BEL	FRA	GER	IRE	NLD	SWE	SWI	UK	Certifications	Album
1993	"Show Me Love"	5	15	9	14	11	29	13	10	9	6	RIAA: Gold; BPI: 2× Platinum	Show Me Love
1993	"Luv 4 Luv"	53	16	7	15	20	24	4	21	20	11		Show Me Love
1993	"What I Do Best"	112	—	36	—	—	—	23	—	—	43		Show Me Love
1994	"I Want to Thank You"	103	—	39	—	—	—	—	—	—	48		Show Me Love
1994	"Back It Up"	—	—	37	—	—	—	40	—	—	43		Show Me Love
1997	"Show Me Love '97"	—	—	—	—	—	—	—	—	—	9		—N/a
1997	"It Must Be Love"	91	—	—	—	—	—	—	—	—	37		From Now On
1997	"You Got the Love" (with T2)	—	—	—	—	—	—	—	—	—	62		—N/a
1998	"Midnight"	—	—	—	—	—	—	—	—	—	—		From Now On
1999	"Dance" (featuring Mary Mary)	—	—	—	—	—	—	—	—	—	—		Dr. Dolittle
1999	"Show Me Love 99"	—	—	—	—	—	—	—	—	—	—		—N/a
2002	"Show Me Love 2002"	—	—	—	—	55	—	80	—	98	61		—N/a
2006	"Show Me Love 2006"	—	—	—	—	—	—	—	—	—	72		—N/a
2008	"Show Me Love 2008"	—	—	24	—	—	—	1	—	—	—		—N/a
2009	"Show Me Love 2009" (with Steve Angello & Laidback Luke)	—	64	—	25	93	25	—	—	—	11		—N/a
2009	"At My Best" (with Corey Gibbons)	—	—	—	—	—	—	—	—	—	—		—N/a
2010	"Straight to the Sky" (with Sandy Vee)	—	—	—	—	—	—	—	—	—	—		—N/a
2011	"Shake It" (with Ctk)	—	—	—	—	—	—	—	—	—	—		—N/a
2012	"All of Me" (with DJ Roland Clark)	—	—	—	—	—	—	—	—	—	—		—N/a
2013	"Rise Again" (with DJ Roland Clark)	—	—	—	—	—	—	—	—	—	—		—N/a
2015	"Love Thing"	—	—	—	—	—	—	—	—	—	—		—N/a
2015	"Blessing Me (Over & Over)"	—	—	—	—	—	—	—	—	—	—		—N/a
2015	"Shout It Out Loud"	—	—	—	—	—	—	—	—	—	—		—N/a
2018	"Get Up and Get In Line" (with Chris Curry)	—	—	—	—	—	—	—	—	—	—		—N/a
2019	"I Believe" (with Phoenix Lord)	—	—	—	—	—	—	—	—	—	—		—N/a
2019	"The Way You Are" (with Preston Glass)	—	—	—	—	—	—	—	—	—	—		—N/a
2020	"All That I Got" (with Todd Terry)	—	—	—	—	—	—	—	—	—	—		—N/a
2022	"See It My Way" (with James Artissen)	—	—	—	—	—	—	—	—	—	—		—N/a
2022	"Love One Another" (with Crystal Waters & Soul Central)	—	—	—	—	—	—	—	—	—	—		—N/a
2023	"What About U" (featuring James Artissen)	—	—	—	—	—	—	—	—	—	—		—N/a
2023	"Live Tonight" (with Young Grey)	—	—	—	—	—	—	—	—	—	—		—N/a
2023	"Tonight" (with Mothers Favorite Child)	—	—	—	—	—	—	—	—	—	—		—N/a
2025	"One More Thing" (with James Artissen)	—	—	—	—	—	—	—	—	—	—		
"—" denotes releases that did not chart or were not released in that territory.

== See also ==
- List of Billboard number-one dance club songs
- List of artists who reached number one on the U.S. Dance Club Songs chart
