= Sorry I'm Late (Mae Muller album) =

Studio album by Mae Muller
- Released: 29 September 2023
- Genre: Pop
- Length: 48:14
- Label: Capitol; EMI; Universal
- Producer: Chris Bishop; Bluf; Lionel Crasta; Jackson Dimiglo-Wood; Jason Evigan; Hank Solo; Henrik Michelsen; MTHR; Bowman Navarro; Neiked; Parisi; Mark Ralph; The Six; Martin Sjølie; Lewis Thompson; TMS

Mae Muller chronology
No One Else, Not Even You (2020)	Sorry I'm Late (2023)

Singles from Sorry I'm Late
- 1. "Better Days" Released: 24 September 2021; 2. "I Just Came to Dance" Released: 27 October 2022; 3. "I Wrote a Song" Released: 9 March 2023; 4. "Me, Myself & I" Released: 29 June 2023; 5. "MTJL" Released: 25 August 2023; 6. "Written by a Woman" Released: 15 September 2023

Sorry I'm Late is the debut studio album by English singer Mae Muller. It was released on 29 September 2023, through Capitol Records, EMI Records and Universal Music Group. The album is supported by six singles: "Better Days" (with Neiked and Polo G), "I Just Came to Dance", "I Wrote a Song", "Me, Myself & I", "MTJL" and "Written by a Woman".

== Background and release ==
Muller teased the release of her debut album through her social media pages. On 25 May 2023, Muller announced that Sorry I'm Late was scheduled to be released on 15 September 2023, with the cover art and tracklist being revealed on the same day as the album announcement. The album will be released on compact disc, cassette, vinyl, and through digital music platforms. Different bundles have been made available on her website. On 7 September, Muller announced that the album would be delayed, and was rescheduled for release on 29 September.

== Music and lyrics ==
Sorry I'm Late consists of seventeen tracks, three of which have been released as singles. "Better Days", a collaboration with Neiked and Polo G was released on 24 September 2021, and was described by Universal Music Canada as "a dreamy, upbeat slice of pop perfection that is filled with joy and hope". Out Now described the song as "a high-energy pop anthem whose optimistic outlook is undeniably catchy". The song is written in the key of C minor, with a tempo of 110 beats per minute. The album's second single, "I Just Came to Dance" was released on 27 October 2022, with the album being described as "vulnerable" and "empowering". "I Wrote a Song" was released on 9 March 2023 and following confirmation of Muller representing the United Kingdom in the Eurovision Song Contest 2023, was later announced as the entry. It was described as a balearic and Latin-pop song with elements of electropop.

== Singles ==
"Better Days", a collaboration with Neiked and Polo G was released on 24 September 2021 as the record's lead single. "I Just Came to Dance" was released on 27 October 2022 as the album's second single. "I Wrote a Song" was released on 9 March 2023 as the album's third single and which is also Muller's entry at Eurovision Song Contest 2023. "Me, Myself & I" was released on 29 June 2023 as album's fourth single. "MTJL (Maybe That's Just Life)" was released on 25 August 2023 as project's fifth track and to make up for the albums delay, on the original release date, September 15, 2023 Mae released the promotional single "Written By A Woman" which serves as the albums closing track. "Nervous (In A Good Way)" is the most recent single from the record being the sixth single which was released alongside the album, on September 29, 2023.

== Critical reception ==
Professional ratings
Aggregate scores
Source	Rating
Metacritic	68/100
Review scores
Source	Rating
Attitude	4/5 stars
Clash	8/10
DIY	4/5 stars
Dork	3/5 stars
The Line of Best Fit	5/10
musicOMH	3/5 stars
NME	3/5 stars

Sorry I'm Late received positive reviews from contemporary music critics. At Metacritic, a website that aggregates reviews of music albums, which assigns a normalized rating out of 100 to reviews from mainstream publications, the album received an average score of 68, based on 5 reviews, indicating "generally favorable reviews".

Charlotte Manning of Attitude stated that "[Muller] isn't afraid to stick her neck out on the line to stay authentic", describing the album as a "beautifully put together pop album". Writing for Clash, Ahmed Narzra wrote that "On Sorry I'm Late, Mae Muller shows that it takes time to perfect and craft a great pop album and that's what she has done here. Every track could be, and probably should be, a single." DIY's Emily Savage noted that "Capturing the highs and lows of womanhood via catchy pop, Sorry I'm Late may have been a long time coming (see what she did there), but it's worth the wait." Dork writer Martyn Young praised the album by saying that "It ticks all the boxes for what energised and vital big pop sounds like in 2023", but criticised its lack of "instinctive dynamism to make it really stand out of the crowd and fly". According to Sophie Williams from NME, "Sorry I'm Late is a lot more fun when it stops trying so hard to prove itself." Reviewing the album for The Line of Best Fit, Finlay Holden opined that "Sorry I'm Late is certainly a belated arrival but it shows signs of positive momentum for Mae Muller", but complained that "it's just a shame that any sense of sonic bravery wasn't given the opportunity to carry that influence further."

== Track listing ==
Standard edition track listing
No.	Title	Writer(s)	Producer(s)	Length
1.	"I Just Came to Dance"	Mae Muller; Noah Gould; Joel Castillo; Jason Evigan; Lionel Crasta	Evigan^{[p]}; Crasta^{[p]}; Bluf	2:24
2.	"Sorry Daniel"	Muller; Pablo Bowman Navarro; Martin Sjølie	Sjølie	3:14
3.	"Bitch with a Broken Heart"	Muller; Von Tiger; Victor Rådström; Mikael Rabus	Neiked	2:51
4.	"I Wrote a Song"	Muller; Karen Poole; Lewis Thompson	Thompson; Alfred Parx^{[a]}	2:45
5.	"Me, Myself & I"	Muller; Rådström; Rabus; Karl Ivert; Kian Sang	Neiked	2:53
6.	"Tatiana" (with Dylan)	Muller; Natasha Woods; Henrik Michelsen	Michelsen	2:56
7.	"Somebody New"	Muller; Georgia Ku; Marco Parisi; Giampaolo Parisi	Parisi; Cameron Gower Poole^{[v]}	3:31
8.	"I Wish I Could Hate You"	Muller; Michelsen; Sophia Brenan	Michelsen	3:09
9.	"Little Bit Sad"	Muller; Michelsen; Hannah Berney	Michelsen	2:38
10.	"MTJL (Maybe That's Just Life)"	Muller; Rådström; Rabus; Ivert; Sang	Neiked; MTHR	1:57
11.	"Breathe"	Muller; Bowman Navarro; Richard Boardman; David Strääf	The Six; Poole^{[v]}	3:14
12.	"Something Real"	Muller; Hank Solo; Kristin Carpenter	Hank Solo	3:23
13.	"Nervous (In a Good Way)"	Muller; M. Parisi; G. Parisi; Mark Ralph; Jo Hill	Ralph; Parisi; Poole^{[v]}	2:55
14.	"Better Days" (with Neiked and Polo G)	Rådström; Rabus; Ivert; Sang; Tiger; Taurus Tremani Bartlett	Neiked	2:40
15.	"Porn Lied to Us"	Muller; Bowman Navarro; Danny Casio	Navarro; Casio; Poole^{[v]}	2:35
16.	"Miss America"	Muller; July Jones; Jackson Dimiglo-Wood	Dimiglo-Wood; Poole^{[v]}	2:43
17.	"Written by a Woman"	Muller; Brenan; Tom Barnes; Benjamin Kohn; Peter Kelleher	Chris Bishop; TMS	2:26
Total length:				48:14

Bonus streaming track
No.	Title	Writer(s)	Producer(s)	Length
18.	"Feels This Good" (Sigala with Mae Muller and Caity Baser featuring Stefflon Don)	Bruce Fielder; Joakim Jarl; Becky Hill; Ella McMahon; Natalie Dunn; Michael Harwood; Dennis White; Amie Miriello; Stephanie Allen	Sigala; Jarly; Steve Manovski^{[v]}	3:10

Notes

- ^{^[p]} signifies a primary and vocal producer.
- ^{^[a]} signifies an additional producer.
- ^{^[v]} signifies a vocal producer.

== Personnel ==
Musicians

- Mae Muller – vocals
- Jason Evigan – bass guitar, drums, keyboards (track 1)
- Castle – background vocals (1)
- Lionel Crasta – drums, keyboards (1)
- Noah Gould – drums, keyboards (1)
- Oleg Kondratenko – conductor (2)
- Pablo Navarro – guitar (2)
- Børre Flyen – percussion (2)
- Fame's Skopje Studio Orchestra – strings (2)
- Von Tiger – background vocals (3)
- Victor Rådström (Note: Victor Rådström and Mikael Rabus are credited collectively as Neiked, while Rådström is also credited individually.) – programming (3, 10, 14), guitar (3); bass guitar, keyboards (5, 14); drums (5); background vocals, percussion (14)
- Mikael Rabus – programming (3, 10), guitar (3); bass guitar, drums, keyboards (5)
- Karen Poole – background vocals (4)
- Alfred Parx – bass guitar, drums, flute, guitar, horns, keyboards, piano, programming, strings, synthesizer, violin (4)
- Lewis Thompson – bass guitar, keyboards, programming, synthesizer (4)
- Karl Ivert (Note: Karl Ivert and Kian Sang are credited both individually and collectively as MTHR.) – ukulele (5); guitar, keyboards, piano (10); background vocals (14)
- Henrik Michelsen – guitar (6, 8, 9), programming (6, 9); bass guitar, Moog bass, synthesizer (6); background vocals (9)
- Dylan – vocals (6)
- Marco Parisi – bass guitar, guitar, keyboards, synthesizer (7, 13)
- Giampaolo Parisi – drums, percussion, programming, sound effects (7, 13)
- Dan Grech-Marguerat – programming (8)
- Kian Sang – guitar, keyboards, piano, programming (10); background vocals (14)
- Rick Boardman – background vocals, keyboards, programming, synthesizer (11)
- David Strääf – drums, guitar, synthesizer (11)
- Hank Solo – bass guitar, drums, guitar, keyboards, programming (12)
- Mark Ralph – keyboards (13)
- Polo G – vocals (14)
- Pablo Bowman – background vocals, bass guitar, guitar (15)
- Danny Casio – keyboards, programming, synthesizer (15)
- Jackson Dimiglo-Wood – bass guitar, piano, programming, synthesizer (16)
- Peter Kelleher – background vocals, keyboards (17)
- Dave Eggar – cello, double bass, string arrangement, viola (17)
- Thomas Barnes – drums (17)
- Benjamin Kohn – guitar (17)
- Katie Thomas – violin (17)
- Ella Eyre – background vocals (18)
- Caity Baser – vocals (18)
- Stefflon Don – vocals (18)

Technical

- Dale Becker – mastering (1–17)
- Kevin Grainger – mastering, mixing (18)
- Clint Gibbs – mixing (1, 3, 5–7, 9, 12–17)
- Jamie Snell – mixing (2)
- Manny Marroquin – mixing (4)
- Dan Grech-Marguerat – mixing (8)
- Darren Heelis – mixing (11)
- Jason Evigan – engineering (1)
- Lionel Crasta – engineering (1)
- Martin Sjølie – engineering, recording arrangement (2)
- Pablo Navarro – engineering (2)
- Neiked – engineering (3, 10)
- Lewis Thompson – engineering (4)
- Henrik Michelsen – engineering (6, 8, 9)
- MTHR – engineering (10)
- Hank Solo – engineering (12)
- Fili Filizzola – engineering (14), mastering assistance (1–3, 5–17)
- Danny Casio – engineering (15)
- Pablo Bowman – engineering (15)
- Chris Bishop – engineering (17)
- Mike Stephenson – engineering (17)
- Phil Faconti – engineering (17)
- Claude Vause – vocal engineering (17)
- Noah McCorkle – mastering assistance (1–17)
- Brandon Hernandez – mastering assistance (4)
- Anthony Vilchis – mixing assistance (4)
- Trey Station – mixing assistance (4)
- Zach Pereyra – mixing assistance (4)
- Charles Haydon Hicks – mixing assistance (8)
- Luke Burgoyne – mixing assistance (8)

== Charts ==
Chart performance for Sorry I'm Late
Chart (2023)	Peak position
Scottish Albums (OCC)	13
UK Albums (OCC)	33
