= Show Me Love (Robin S. song) =

1990 single by Robin S

- Artwork for the 1993 US CD release

Single by Robin S.

from the album Show Me Love
- Released: October 13, 1990
- Genre: House; diva house; house-pop; deep house
- Length: 4:29 (album version); 3:21 (single version)
- Label: Champion; Big Beat; ZYX
- Songwriters: Allen George; Fred McFarlane
- Producers: Allen George; Fred McFarlane

Robin S. singles chronology
"Show Me Love" (1990)	"Luv 4 Luv" (1993)

Music video
- "Show Me Love" on YouTube

"Show Me Love" is a song by the American singer Robin S. It was written by Allen George and Fred McFarlane and released in October 1990 by Champion Records in the United Kingdom. In 1992, a remix by the Swedish house music producer StoneBridge was released in Europe, the US and Japan. It became Robin S.'s biggest hit, one of the best known house tracks in the United Kingdom and helped house music enter the mainstream. In 1993, it was included on Robin S.'s debut album, Show Me Love.

In the US, "Show Me Love" reached number five on the Billboard Hot 100, number four Cash Box Top 100, number seven on the R&B chart and number one on the dance club chart. It was certified gold by and by and sold 600,000 copies. It reached number six on the UK singles chart in April 1993. Its music video was directed by Millicent Shelton, featuring Robin S. performing in a nightclub. In 2022 and 2025, Rolling Stone and Billboard named "Show Me Love" one of the greatest dance songs.

== Recording ==
The first version of "Show Me Love" was released in 1990 on the British label Champion Records. The producers, Allen George and Fred McFarlane, hired Andrea Martin as a session vocalist to sing the demo. Robin Jackson Maynard, also known as Robin S., was uncomfortable with the tempo, as she had a background in R&B and pop. Maynard said she did not hear Martin's demo.

Billboard described the first version as an uptempo funk, with saxophone and piano. In 1992, the Swedish DJ and producer StoneBridge contacted Champion looking for songs to remix; they suggested "Show Me Love". Champion rejected his first remix, saying he had retained too much of the original. In a few hours, StoneBridge made a second remix, discarding everything but the vocal and kick drum. For the bassline, he changed his Korg M1 synthesizer to the next preset, an organ sound, and liked the effect. Two critics likened the sound to a xylophone.

At an American Society of Composers, Authors and Publishers panel in 2011, Martin discussed her work on the demo of "Show Me Love". This led to rumors that Martin was the singer on the final version, which was dismissed by Maynard, Martin's songwriting partner Ivan Matias, and the record executive Joey Carvello, who licensed the remix to Atlantic Records. Matias said Martin's statements at the panel had been misinterpreted.

== Writing credits ==
Martin said she helped write the vocal melody but accepted a one-time fee of $300 rather than writing credits, as it made her ineligible for publishing income. Maynard said she also contributed to the melody but did not receive writing credits. McFarlane died in 2016; in 2022, Maynard said she hoped George would one day give her a portion of the credits. As is standard for remixes, StoneBridge did not receive a writing credit, though he said it brought him new work opportunities.

== Commercial performance ==
The first version of "Show Me Love" was a commercial failure; according to DJ Mag, it "didn't stand out among the many quality vocal house tracks that were blooming at the start of the '90s". In the US, the 1992 StoneBridge remix reached number five on the Billboard Hot 100 on June 12, 1993, and number one on the Hot Dance Club Songs chart on May 8. It reached number four on the Cash Box Top 100 and number seven on the Hot R&B/Hip-Hop Songs chart. It was certified gold and sold 600,000 copies. In Canada, it reached number two on the RPM Dance/Urban chart.

The remix debuted at number 66 on the UK singles chart and reached number six on April 4. It reached number two in Spain, number nine in Belgium and Switzerland, and number ten in Sweden. It was a top-20 hit in Austria (15), Denmark (20), France (14), Germany (11), Iceland (14), Italy (17), and the Netherlands (13). On the European Hot 100 Singles, "Show Me Love" reached number 26 on September 25. Elsewhere, the song peaked at number six in Zimbabwe, and in 1994, number 78 in Australia. "Show Me Love" remains Maynard's only US top-40 song. She used the success to earn money through live performances. StoneBridge only learned his remix had become a hit during a visit to London months later, when he watched the weekly TV show Top of the Pops.

== Critical reception ==
The AllMusic editor Alex Henderson observed the influence of Evelyn "Champagne" King on Maynard's vocals, but wrote that she was "obviously her own person". He said the success led many to think of Maynard as a "dance-floor diva". J.D. Considine from The Baltimore Sun praised the "stomping, bass-driven" song as one of the "best moments" on Maynard's debut album. Larry Flick from Billboard magazine described it as a "big, finger-wavin' performance" combined with "an understated arrangement of icy cool electro beats". M.R. Martinez from Cash Box wrote that "Show Me Love" would "become a testament to any dance floor DJ".

A writer for Complex described "Show Me Love" as "pure" and "powerful", while Anderson Jones from Entertainment Weekly described it as a "techno-tinged house tune". Joe Muggs from Fact wrote, "For all its poppiness, this is a dark, fierce, attitude-filled beast of a record." Howard Cohen from Knight-Ridder Newspapers wrote: "Distinctive, burbling keyboard pattern and rich singing infuse this house classic. A must." Holly Barringer from Melody Maker said, "I think it's that electronic xylophone effect that does it for me. And those vocals. The kind of big, sassy voice that fills your ears. Warm and tight and snappy."

The European magazine Music & Media wrote of the "buzzing synth basslines and synthesised xylophone". Alan Jones from Music Week stated on the 1997 re-release, that the track "is widely recognised as one of the classic dance tracks of the Nineties and the original can't be improved on, but our old friend "public demand" has apparently forced a re-release." He added, "Reserve a place in the upper echelons of the chart." A reviewer from The Orlando Sentinel viewed it as "hard-driving". Jeremy Helligar from People Magazine remarked that the singer "sounded so caught up in the rapture of the rhythm that listeners couldn't help following suit." Popdust noted "that gorgeous, glorious riff", adding that Robin S. "sounds shell-shocked and devastated, like she's pleading for her guy to show her love, because she just doesn't know if she can take another crushing disappointment. It's very dark, and could have been overwhelmingly dour, if not for the snare-and-hi-hat shuffle that keeps propelling the song forward." Rob Sheffield from Spin said it was "great" and called its synthesiser riff "haunting". TMZ described it as "infectious" and said Maynard was an "icon in the '90s club scene".

== Impact and legacy ==
The song made it to the top five on the Billboard Hot 100 in the United States, a rare feat for a house song at the time. According to The Guardian, "Show Me Love" has influenced contemporary house songs such as Kiesza's "Hideaway" (2014) and Disclosure's "White Noise" (2013), and artists such as Clean Bandit and Felix Jaehn. In 2000, VH1 ranked it number 73 in its list of "100 Greatest Dance Songs". In 2006, Slant Magazine ranked the song 41st in its "100 Greatest Dance Songs" list, writing, "'Show Me Love' was not just one of the biggest house-pop crossovers of the early-'90s club-radio boom, it was also one of the last. At least radio house went out with its face on (that is, before it came back in its more Euro varieties). 1993's 'Show Me Love' was as representative as any track of the way house distilled disco's flamboyant, strings-and-all yearning into a minimal thump with skeletal keyboards doing the bulk of melodic support (as defined by Swedish producer Stonebridge's remix). In 2011, The Guardian featured the song in its "A History of Modern Music: Dance". In 2014, Complex included it in their "Songs Every Dance Music Fan Should Know, Vol. 1", naming it "a perfect track." They wrote, "Whatever the case may be, there are memorable hooks or vocals from that era, but 'Show Me Love' is indicative of the soul and heart that resided within the house scene for a while." In 2022, Rolling Stone ranked "Show Me Love" number nine in their list of "200 Greatest Dance Songs of All Time" saying, "Beyoncé knows it, Charli XCX knows it, and if you don't know it by now, put a pause on this list and go listen to it." In 2023 and 2025, Billboard magazine ranked it among the "500 Best Pop Songs of All Time" and "The 100 Best Dance Songs of All Time".

=== Sampling ===
"Show Me Love" was sampled by Jason Derulo in his single "Don't Wanna Go Home", from his 2011 album Future History. The American hip hop artist Kid Ink interpolated it in his 2013 single "Show Me", which features guest vocals from Chris Brown. In 2023, Maynard said "Show Me" was her favorite use of the sample. "Show Me Love" was interpolated in the 2016 song "Your Love" by the French DJ and producer David Guetta and the Dutch electronic dance music duo Showtek. Charli XCX sampled "Show Me Love" on "Used to Know Me" from her 2022 album Crash. After Beyoncé sampled "Show Me Love" for "Break My Soul", the lead single from her 2022 album Renaissance, various record labels, corporations, and other artists inquired about licensing the master recordings. Maynard said Beyoncé's use of the song was "one of the highest compliments ever".

=== Accolades ===
Year	Publisher	Country	Accolade	Rank
1993	The Face	United Kingdom	"Singles of the Year"	5
1993	The Village Voice	United States	"Singles of the Year"	18
1994	WMC International Dance Music Awards	United States	"Best House 12″"	1
1994	WMC International Dance Music Awards	United States	"Best 12" Dance Record"	1
1995	BMI	United States	"BMI Pop Awards"	*
1996	Mixmag	United Kingdom	"The 100 Best Dance Singles of All Time"	93
1998	DJ Magazine	United Kingdom	"Top 100 Club Tunes"	40
2000	VH1	United States	"100 Greatest Dance Songs"	73
2005	Bruce Pollock	United States	"The 7,500 Most Important Songs of 1944-2000"	*
2006	Slant Magazine	United States	"100 Greatest Dance Songs"	41
2011	The Guardian	United Kingdom	"A History of Modern Music: Dance"	*
2011	MTV Dance	United Kingdom	"The 100 Biggest 90's Dance Anthems of All Time"	43
2011	Slant Magazine	United States	"The 100 Best Singles of the 1990s"	80
2012	Porcys	Poland	"100 Singli 1990-1999"	18
2013	Mixmag	United Kingdom	"50 Greatest Dance Tracks of All Time"	34
2013	Vibe	United States	"Before EDM: 30 Dance Tracks from the '90s That Changed the Game"	8
2014	Complex	United States	"Songs Every Dance Music Fan Should Know, Vol. 1"	*
2014	Fact	United Kingdom	"21 Diva-House Belters That Still Sound Incredible"	8
2015	Robert Dimery	United States	"1,001 Songs You Must Hear Before You Die, and 10,001 You Must Download (2015 Update)"	*
2017	Heart TV	United Kingdom	"55 Biggest 90's Club Classics"	1
2017	BuzzFeed	United States	"The 101 Greatest Dance Songs of the '90s"	16
2018	Mixmag	United Kingdom	"The 30 Best Vocal House Anthems Ever"	*
2019	Billboard	United States	"Billboard's Top Songs of the '90s"	333
2019	Mixmag	United Kingdom	"15 of the Best Classic House Tracks About Love"	*
2019	Mixmag	United Kingdom	"The 20 Best Diva House Tracks"	*
2020	NME	United Kingdom	"The 20 Best House Music Songs... Ever!"	*
2020	Slant Magazine	United States	"The 100 Best Dance Songs of All Time"	19
2022	Classic Pop	United Kingdom	"90s Dance – The Essential Playlist"	6
2022	Pitchfork	United States	"The 30 Best House Tracks of the ’90s"	*
2022	Pitchfork	United States	"The 250 Best Songs of the 1990s"	67
2022	Rolling Stone	United States	"200 Greatest Dance Songs of All Time"	9
2023	Billboard	United States	"Best Pop Songs of All Time"	170
2025	Billboard	United States	"The 100 Best Dance Songs of All Time"	9
2025	Billboard	United States	"The 50 Best House Songs of All Time"	4

(*) indicates the list is unordered.

== Track listings ==
1990 12" vinyl (as Robin Stone)
No.	Title	Length
1.	"Show Me Love" (Montego Mix)	6:45
2.	"Show Me Love" (Dub Mix)	3:30
3.	"Show Me Love" (New York Mix)	5:51
4.	"Show Me Love" (Maritius Mix)	4:07

- Tracks 1 & 4 mixed by Anthony King.

1992 12" vinyl
No.	Title	Length
1.	"Show Me Love" (StoneBridge Club Mix)	7:43
2.	"Show Me Love" (Nick Nice Eagle Mix)	5:31
3.	"Show Me Love" (Nice & Stoned Old School Mix)	5:33

- Additional production by StoneBridge. Remixes by Nick Nice & StoneBridge.

1993 UK CD single / 2009 UK digital download
No.	Title	Length
1.	"Show Me Love" (Radio Mix)	3:21
2.	"Show Me Love" (Nick Nice Eagle Mix)	5:32
3.	"Show Me Love" (StoneBridge Club Mix)	7:44
4.	"Show Me Love" (Nice 'N' Steady Old School Mix)	5:34
5.	"Show Me Love" (New Club Mix)	8:52

1993 US 12" vinyl / CD single
No.	Title	Length
1.	"Show Me Love" (StoneBridge Club Mix)	7:43
2.	"Show Me Love" (Nick Nice Eagle Mix)	5:28
3.	"Show Me Love" (New Club Mix)	8:50
4.	"Show Me Love" (Nice & Stoned Old School Mix)	5:33

== Charts ==
=== Weekly charts ===
Chart (1992–1994)	Peak position
Australia (ARIA)	78
Austria (Ö3 Austria Top 40)	15
Belgium (Ultratop 50 Flanders)	9
Canada Retail Singles (The Record)	3
Canada Dance/Urban (RPM)	2
Denmark (IFPI)	20
Europe (Eurochart Hot 100)	26
Europe (European Dance Radio)	1
France (SNEP)	14
Germany (GfK)	11
Iceland (Íslenski Listinn Topp 40)	14
Ireland (IRMA)	29
Israel (Israeli Singles Chart)	16
Italy (Musica e dischi)	17
Netherlands (Dutch Top 40)	13
Netherlands (Single Top 100)	13
Slovakia Airplay (ČNS IFPI)	30
Spain (AFYVE)	2
Sweden (Sverigetopplistan)	10
Switzerland (Schweizer Hitparade)	9
UK Singles (Official Charts)	6
UK Dance (Music Week)	1
UK Club Chart (Music Week)	25
US Billboard Hot 100	5
US Dance Club Songs (Billboard)	1
US Hot R&B/Hip-Hop Songs (Billboard)	7
US Maxi-Singles Sales (Billboard)	1
US Cash Box Top 100	4
Zimbabwe (ZIMA)	6

Chart (1997)	Peak position
Belgium Dance (Ultratop)	13
Denmark (IFPI)	17
Europe (Eurochart Hot 100)	48
Scottish Singles Sales (Official Charts)	16
UK Dance (Official Charts)	3

Chart (2002)	Peak position
Germany (GfK)	55
Netherlands (Single Top 100)	80
Switzerland (Schweizer Hitparade)	98

Chart (2008)	Peak position
Belgium (Ultratop 50 Flanders)	24
Belgium (Ultratop 50 Wallonia)	29
Netherlands (Dutch Top 40)	1
Netherlands (Single Top 100)	2

=== Year-end charts ===
Chart (1993)	Position
Belgium (Ultratop 50 Flanders)	42
Canada Dance/Urban (RPM)	22
Europe (Eurochart Hot 100)	57
Europe (European Dance Radio)	7
Germany (Media Control)	65
Netherlands (Dutch Top 40)	32
Netherlands (Single Top 100)	20
Sweden (Topplistan)	94
UK Singles (OCC)	52
UK Club Chart (Music Week)	11
US Billboard Hot 100	17
US Dance Club Play (Billboard)	4
US Hot R&B Singles (Billboard)	30
US Maxi-Singles Sales (Billboard)	2
US Cash Box Top 100	29

Chart (1997)	Position
UK Club Chart (Music Week)	58

Chart (2008)	Position
Netherlands (Dutch Top 40)	31
Netherlands (Single Top 100)	43

== Certifications ==
Region	Certification	Certified units/sales
Italy (FIMI)	Gold	50,000^{‡}
New Zealand (RMNZ)	Gold	15,000^{‡}
United Kingdom (BPI)	2× Platinum	1,200,000^{‡}
United States (RIAA)	Gold	500,000^{^}
^{^} Shipments figures based on certification alone.^{‡} Sales+streaming figures based on certification alone.

== Release history ==
Region	Date	Format(s)	Label(s)	Ref.
United Kingdom	October 13, 1990	12-inch vinyl	Champion	
United Kingdom (re-release)	January 4, 1993	7-inch vinyl; 12-inch vinyl; CD single; cassette	Champion	
Australia	August 30, 1993	CD; cassette	Liberation; Big Beat	
Japan	September 22, 1993	CD	Big Beat	

== Personnel ==
- Producer – Allen George, Fred McFarlane
- Co-producer – StoneBridge
- Mix – StoneBridge, P. Dennis Mitchell, Junior Vasquez
- Engineer – P. Dennis Mitchell, Dave Sussman, Nat Foster, Robert Kiss
- Keyboards – Fred McFarlane, Richard Tomlinson, Joe Moskowitz, Matt Thomas, Stonebridge, Robert Kiss
- Guitar – Paul Jackson Jr., Dana Reed, Mike Cantwell
- Backing vocals – Dana Reed, Debbie Cole, Dennis Taylor, Kim Miller, Luci Martin, Robin Stone, Vivian Sessoms

== Michael Mind version ==
=== Track listing ===
German CD single
No.	Title	Length
1.	"Show Me Love" (radio edit)	2:38
2.	"Show Me Love" (short edit)	3:08
3.	"Show Me Love" (extended mix)	5:18
4.	"Show Me Love" (club mix)	5:18
5.	"Show Me Love" (Gap 4 remix edit)	2:46
6.	"Show Me Love" (Gap 4 remix)	3:47
7.	"Show Me Love" (G&G remix cut)	3:47
8.	"Show Me Love" (G&G remix)	6:40

Digital download — 2014 version
No.	Title	Length
1.	"Show Me Love" (official festival mix edit)	3:28
2.	"Show Me Love" (official festival mix)	5:34
3.	"Show Me Love" (Benjiy edit)	3:14
4.	"Show Me Love" (Benjiy remix)	4:56

=== Charts ===
Chart (2008)	Peak Position
Austria (Ö3 Austria Top 40)	41
Belgium (Ultratip Bubbling Under Wallonia)	22
France (SNEP)	17
Germany (GfK)	38
Switzerland (Schweizer Hitparade)	58

== Steve Angello and Laidback Luke version ==
"Show Me Love"

Single by Steve Angello and Laidback Luke featuring Robin S.
- Released: December 12, 2008
- Genre: House
- Length: 3:04 (radio edit); 6:40 (extended mix)
- Label: Happy; Data; Ministry of Sound; MixMash; Ultra
- Songwriters: Allen George; Fred McFarlane
- Producers: Steve Angello; Laidback Luke; Hal Ritson

In 2008, following the successful sample of the Mobin Master cover mashup with their song, "Be", Swedish DJ and producer Steve Angello and Filipino-Dutch DJ Laidback Luke used the parts to reconstruct their mashup. Robin S. is featured re-recording her vocals, engineered and co-produced by Mobin Master, which was initially recorded for his version. Also featured are additional vocals from Hal Ritson (co-producer) and Yolanda Quartey. It was originally released through the Happy Music label on December 12, and has had multiple re-releases since. "Show Me Love" is one of Angello's and Luke's best known singles, especially in the United Kingdom where it topped the UK Dance Chart in 2009.

The song was also an international breakthrough for Dutch DJ Hardwell. The song is based on his illegal bootleg mashup of Mobin Master's cover of "Show Me Love", with vocalist Karina Chavez and the instrumental track "Be" by Steve Angello & Laidback Luke.

=== Track listing ===
2008 digital download (France)
No.	Title	Length
1.	"Show Me Love" (Radio Edit)	3:04
2.	"Show Me Love" (Extended Mix)	6:40
3.	"Show Me Love" (Hardwell Style)	5:18
4.	"Show Me Love" (Hardwell Sunrise Mix)	6:46

2009 CD single (UK)
No.	Title	Length
1.	"Show Me Love" (Radio Edit)	3:08
2.	"Show Me Love" (Blame Edit)	2:56
3.	"Show Me Love" (Bootleg Mix)	5:17
4.	"Show Me Love" (Extended Mix)	6:42
5.	"Show Me Love" (AC Slater Vocal Mix)	5:49
6.	"Show Me Love" (Blame Remix)	5:29
7.	"Show Me Love" (Original Dub)	6:48

- Includes the video of "Show Me Love" (3:08).

2009 digital download (Spain)
No.	Title	Length
1.	"Show Me Love" (Extended Mix)	6:40
2.	"Show Me Love" (Hardwell & Sunrise Remix)	6:46
3.	"Show Me Love" (Style Of Eye Remix)	10:03
4.	"Show Me Love" (Partysquad Remix)	3:38
5.	"Show Me Love" (Blame Remix)	5:29
6.	"Show Me Love" (Afrojack Short Remix)	5:45
7.	"Show Me Love" (AC Slater Vocal Mix)	5:49
8.	"Show Me Love" (Radio Edit)	3:04

2009 digital download (Italy)
No.	Title	Length
1.	"Show Me Love" (Extended Mix)	6:41
2.	"Show Me Love" (Radio Edit)	3:04
3.	"Show Me Love" (Hardwell & Sunrise Remix)	6:43
4.	"Show Me Love" (Partysquad Remix)	3:36
5.	"Show Me Love" (Afrojack Short Remix)	5:45
6.	"Show Me Love" (Blame Remix)	5:25
7.	"Show Me Love" (AC Slater Vocal Mix)	5:47
8.	"Show Me Love" (Style Of Eye Remix)	10:02
9.	"Show Me Love" (AC Slater Dub Mix)	4:32
10.	"Show Me Love" (Blame Edit)	2:53
11.	"Show Me Love" (Bismark Remix)	6:56

2009 digital download (Netherlands)
No.	Title	Length
1.	"Show Me Love" (AC Slater Dub)	4:35
2.	"Show Me Love" (AC Slater Vocal Mix)	5:49
3.	"Show Me Love" (Afrojack Short Remix)	5:45
4.	"Show Me Love" (Blame Dub)	5:29
5.	"Show Me Love" (Blame Edit)	2:55
6.	"Show Me Love" (Hardwell's Sunrise Mix)	6:46
7.	"Show Me Love" (Partysquad Remix)	3:38
8.	"Show Me Love" (Radio Edit)	3:04
9.	"Show Me Love" (Style Of Eye Remix)	10:03
10.	"Show Me Love" (DBN Remix)	6:58
11.	"Show Me Love" (Bootleg Version)	5:18
12.	"Show Me Love" (Extended Mix)	6:40

2009 digital download (U.S.)
No.	Title	Length
1.	"Show Me Love" (Radio Edit)	3:04
2.	"Show Me Love" (Extended Mix)	6:40
3.	"Show Me Love" (Style of Eye Remix)	10:03
4.	"Show Me Love" (AC Slater Vocal Mix)	5:49
5.	"Show Me Love" (Afrojack Short Remix)	5:45
6.	"Show Me Love" (Blame Remix)	5:29
7.	"Show Me Love" (Hardwell & Sunrise Remix)	6:46
8.	"Show Me Love" (Partysquad Remix)	3:38

Digital download – 2015 remixes
No.	Title	Length
1.	"Show Me Love" (Anevo remix radio edit)	3:24
2.	"Show Me Love" (Solodisco remix radio edit)	2:59
3.	"Show Me Love" (Anevo remix)	5:14
4.	"Show Me Love" (Solodisco remix)	4:34
5.	"Show Me Love" (Boeboe remix)	5:00

=== Charts ===
==== Weekly charts ====
Chart (2009)	Peak position
Australia (ARIA)	73
Austria (Ö3 Austria Top 40)	64
France (SNEP)	25
Germany (GfK)	93
Ireland (IRMA)	25
Scottish Singles Sales (Official Charts)	6
UK Singles (Official Charts)	11
UK Dance (Official Charts)	1

==== Year-end charts ====
Chart (2009)	Position
UK Singles (OCC)	156

=== Certifications ===
Region	Certification	Certified units/sales
United Kingdom (BPI)	Platinum	600,000^{‡}
^{‡} Sales+streaming figures based on certification alone.

== Sam Feldt version ==
"Show Me Love"

Single by Sam Feldt featuring Kimberly Anne
- Released: February 16, 2015
- Length: 3:01
- Label: Spinnin'; Polydor
- Songwriters: Allen George; Fred McFarlane
- Producer: Sam Feldt

Sam Feldt singles chronology
"Hot Skin" (2014)	"Show Me Love" (2015)	"Midnight Hearts" (2015)

In 2015, the song was remade by producer Sam Feldt featuring vocals from Kimberly Anne. It was released as a digital download on 16 February 2015 through Spinnin' Records. Several remixes were released on 21 June 2015, including EDX's Indian Summer Remix, which became most popular.

=== Track listing ===
Digital download – single
No.	Title	Length
1.	"Show Me Love" (featuring Kimberly Anne)	3:01

Digital download – remixes
No.	Title	Length
1.	"Show Me Love" (featuring Kimberly Anne) (Extended Mix)	5:24
2.	"Show Me Love" (featuring Kimberly Anne) (EDX's Indian Summer Remix)	6:40
3.	"Show Me Love" (featuring Kimberly Anne) (Kryder & Tom Staar Remix)	4:54
4.	"Show Me Love" (featuring Kimberly Anne) (Kokiri Remix)	6:34
5.	"Show Me Love" (featuring Kimberly Anne) (Quintino Remix)	4:13
6.	"Show Me Love" (featuring Kimberly Anne) (Zac Samuel Remix)	3:27

=== Charts ===
==== Weekly charts ====
Chart (2015)	Peak position
Australia (ARIA)	19
Austria (Ö3 Austria Top 40)	30
Belgium (Ultratop 50 Flanders)	11
Belgium (Ultratop 50 Wallonia)	21
Czech Republic Airplay (ČNS IFPI)	44
Denmark (Tracklisten)	39
France (SNEP)	82
Germany (GfK)	39
Hungary (Single Top 40)	39
Ireland (IRMA)	12
Netherlands (Dutch Top 40)	19
Netherlands (Single Top 100)	15
Scottish Singles Sales (Official Charts)	4
Slovakia Airplay (ČNS IFPI)	30
Sweden (Sverigetopplistan)	50
Switzerland (Schweizer Hitparade)	38
UK Singles (Official Charts)	4
UK Dance (Official Charts)	2
US Hot Dance/Electronic Songs (Billboard)	13

==== Year-end charts ====
Chart (2015)	Position
Belgium (Ultratop Flanders)	68
Netherlands (Dutch Top 40)	72
Netherlands (Single Top 100)	66
UK Singles (OCC)	63
US Hot Dance/Electronic Songs (Billboard)	44

=== Certifications ===
Region	Certification	Certified units/sales
Australia (ARIA)	Gold	35,000^{‡}
Belgium (BRMA)	Gold	10,000^{‡}
Denmark (IFPI Danmark)	Platinum	90,000^{‡}
Germany (BVMI)	Gold	200,000^{‡}
Italy (FIMI)	Gold	25,000^{‡}
New Zealand (RMNZ)	Platinum	30,000^{‡}
Sweden (GLF)	Platinum	40,000^{‡}
United Kingdom (BPI)	Platinum	600,000^{‡}
^{‡} Sales+streaming figures based on certification alone.

=== Release history ===
Country	Release date	Format	Label
United Kingdom	21 June 2015	Digital download	Spinnin'
Australia	21 June 2015	Digital download	Spinnin'
