= One Way (American band) =

American rhythm and blues band

- Also known as: Al Hudson & the Soul Partners, One Way featuring Al Hudson
- Origin: Detroit, Michigan, U.S.
- Genres: R&B, funk, soul, disco
- Years active: 1976–present
- Labels: ABC, MCA, Capitol
- Past members: Al Hudson; Alicia Myers; Dave Roberson; Cortez Harris; Kevin McCord; Gregory Greene; Jonathan Meadows; Candyce Edwards; Jeanette Mack-Jackson; Lorrie Tice; Valdez Brantley

One Way is an American R&B and funk band that was popular in the late 1970s, and throughout most of the 1980s, led by singer Al Hudson. The group's most successful record was "Cutie Pie", which reached number 4 on the Billboard Soul Singles chart and number 61 on the pop chart in 1982. The band also gained popularity for ballads; most of which were not released as singles, but received airplay on urban radio stations. These included "Don't Stop" (1984), "You" (1982), "Something in the Past" (1980), "Guess You Didn't Know" (1979), and "Lost Inside of You" (1978).

== Al Hudson and the (Soul) Partners ==
Detroit vocalist Al Hudson, guitarist Dave Roberson and bassist Kevin McCord (b. Kevin Duane McCord, 1954, Detroit, Michigan) founded Al Hudson and the Soul Partners in the mid 1970s. Other members included keyboardists Jack Hall and Jonathan "Corky" Meadows, drummers Theodore Dudley and Gregory Greene, Gary Andrews and guitarist Cortez Harris.

They recorded several singles for Atco Records before joining ABC Records and made their debut with the LP Especially for You in 1977. They recorded their second album, Cherish, that same year and released their third album Spreading Love in 1978 from which the single "Spread Love" was released. Although not charting in the UK, it became a big hit in the clubs. By that time ABC Records was in the process of being bought by MCA Records and vocalist Alicia Myers joined the group. They released the album Happy Feet as Al Hudson and the Partners in 1979 which contains the R&B hit "You Can Do It", which was co-penned by Myers. The single also peaked at number 10 on Billboard’s Disco Action Top 80 Chart in June 1979, as well as a top 15 hit in the UK.

== One Way ==
When ABC merged with MCA Records, they subsequently changed their name to One Way featuring Al Hudson. Their next album was simply called One Way Featuring Al Hudson and was also released in 1979. The album included the long 12" version of "You Can Do It". Their 1980 album was also confusingly called One Way featuring Al Hudson. By 1981, the band was simply called One Way.

In 1981, frontwoman Alicia Myers left the band to pursue a solo career. She was replaced by Candyce Edwards, who served as female lead of the group from 1981 until 1985. Edwards' debut was on the Fancy Dancer album and she remained with the group throughout their major success. After Edwards left the group in 1985, Jeanette Mack-Jackson replaced Edwards as lead singer.

They were on MCA’s roster until 1988. They scored five top 10 U.S. R&B chart hits, with the biggest being "Cutie Pie", which reached number four in 1982. One Way had R&B hit "Mr. Groove", about James Brown, in 1984.

They had two more minor hits on the UK Singles Chart with "Music" (1979) and "Let's Talk" (1985). They gained US R&B hits such as "Don't Think About It" and "You Better Quit" in 1987.

They moved to Capitol Records in 1988, where they released the album A New Beginning later that same year. By this time, only Hudson, Roberson, and Meadows remained from the original line-up.

In 2019, after a 31-year hiatus, One Way featuring Al Hudson released their 12th album, New Old School.

== Discography ==
=== Albums ===
Year	Album	Peak chart positions	
Year	Album	US	US R&B
As Al Hudson and the Soul Partners
1976	Especially for You	—	—
1977	Cherish	—	—
1978	Spreading Love	—	—
As Al Hudson and the Partners
1979	Happy Feet	—	30
As One Way featuring Al Hudson
1979	One Way featuring Al Hudson	128	25
1980	One Way featuring Al Hudson	—	—
As One Way
1981	Love Is...One Way	157	18
1981	Fancy Dancer	79	11
1982	Who's Foolin' Who	51	8
1982	Wild Night	—	16
1983	Shine on Me	164	27
1984	Lady	58	1
1985	Wrap Your Body	156	28
1986	IX	—	27
1988	A New Beginning	—	—
2019	#NewOldSchool	—	—
"—" denotes releases that did not chart.

=== Compilation albums ===
- 1993: Cutie Pie
- 1995: Push
- 1996: The Best of One Way: Featuring Al Hudson and Alicia Myers
- 2005: 20th Century Masters: Millennium Collection

=== Singles ===
==== Al Hudson and the Soul Partners ====
Year	Single	Chart positions			
Year	Single	US Pop	US R&B	US Dance	UK
1976	"I Got a Notion"	—	64	—	—
1977	"Feelings"	—	—	—	—
1977	"Why Must We Say Goodbye"	—	83	—	—
1977	"If You Feel Like Dancin'"	—	78	—	—
1977	"Real Love"	—	—	—	—
1978	"Dance Get Down (Feel the Groove)"	—	—	—	57
1978	"Spread Love"	—	75	—	—
1978	"How Do You Do"	—	51	—	—
1979	"You Can Do It" (credited as Al Hudson & the Partners)	101	52	10	15
"—" denotes releases that did not chart or were not released in that territory.

==== One Way ====
Year	Single	Chart positions			
Year	Single	US Pop	US R&B	US Dance	UK
1980	"Music"	—	36	30	56
1980	"Do Your Thang"	—	36	32	—
1980	"Pop It"	—	20	—	—
1980	"Something in the Past"	—	76	—	—
1981	"My Lady"	—	52	—	—
1981	"Push"	—	12	—	—
1981	"Pull Fancy Dancer Pull - Part 1"	—	12	—	—
1982	"Who's Foolin' Who"	—	34	—	—
1982	"Cutie Pie"	61	4	29	—
1982	"Runnin' Away"	—	83	—	—
1982	"Wild Night"	—	36	—	—
1983	"Can I"	—	43	—	—
1983	"Shine on Me"	—	24	42	88
1983	"Let's Get Together"	—	44	—	—
1984	"Lady You Are"	—	5	—	—
1984	"Mr. Groove"	—	8	—	84
1984	"Don't Stop"	—	51	—	—
1985	"Serving It"	—	66	—	—
1985	"Let's Talk"	—	—	—	64
1985	"More than Friends, Less than Lovers"	—	52	—	—
1986	"Don't Think About It"	—	5	44	97
1987	"You Better Quit"	—	6	29	100
1987	"Whammy"	—	25	—	—
1988	"Driving Me Crazy"	—	75	—	—
"—" denotes releases that did not chart or were not released in that territory.

== See also ==
- R. J.'s Latest Arrival – Soul/R&B group from Detroit
- Bar-Kays
- Con Funk Shun
