= Champion Records (UK) =

UK-based record label

Champion Records is an independent record label based in Harlesden, a neighbourhood in Brent, north-west London, England. Champion Records was founded by Mel Medalie in 1980. The label specialised in releasing soul, dance, and house music primarily featuring British and American artists. Former A&R staff include the producer Paul Oakenfold.

In 2013, the label was relaunched in tandem with Madhouse Records and Rogue Industries. The current director is Munasi Oscar Porter and the general manager is Raj Porter.
