= The Unhealthy Club Tour =

2023–24 concert tour by Anne-Marie

- Tour by Anne-Marie
- Location: Europe; Asia
- Associated album: Unhealthy
- Start date: 14 November 2023
- End date: 7 October 2024
- Legs: 3
- No. of shows: 30
- Supporting acts: Leah Kate; Evissimax; Georgia; Devon; Mae Stephens; Charlotte Plank; ADMT; Beth McCarthy; Caity Baser

Anne-Marie concert chronology
- Dysfunctional Tour (2022); The Unhealthy Club Tour (2023–2024); ...

The Unhealthy Club Tour was the third headlining tour by English singer-songwriter Anne-Marie, in support of her third studio album Unhealthy (2023). Comprising 30 shows across three legs, the first leg officially began on 14 November 2023, in Amsterdam, Netherlands, and came to an end on 29 November 2023 at The O2 Arena in London, UK. The second leg began on 20 June 2024, in Scarborough, UK, while the third leg began on 24 September 2024 in Tokyo, Japan. The tour concluded on 7 October 2024 in Taipei, Taiwan.

== Background ==
On 19 May 2023, Anne-Marie announced The Unhealthy Club Tour, scheduled to take place from 14 November to 29 November 2023. The tour locations were also announced, with the singer performing in cities across the UK, Ireland and Europe. Tickets were released to the general public on 26 May at 9 am BST, with the option of pre-sale tickets given to those who pre-ordered Unhealthy through the singer's official website. The pre-sale tickets were available on 24 May at 9 am BST. On 9 October 2023, Leah Kate was announced as the opening act for the tour.

In an interview with Hits Radio, Anne-Marie described the tour as "very theatrical", further stating, "I grew up with musical theatre, and I've gone back to those days and I'm putting on a show which incorporates musical theatre, with my music".

On 21 November 2023, Anne-Marie announced on her social media that a “Summer Run” of the Unhealthy Club Tour would be taking place across England and Wales in summer 2024.

On 17 May 2024, Anne-Marie announced a number of shows in Asia, scheduled to take place from 24 September to 7 October 2024.

== Setlist ==
=== Leg 1 (Europe 2023) ===
This setlist represents the set from the first show of the leg and may not represent the entirety of this leg.

Act 1 – The House

1. "Alarm"
2. "Sad Bitch"
3. "Trainwreck"
4. "Cuckoo"
5. "Birthday"
6. "Perfect To Me"

Act 2 – Outdoors

7. "You & I"
8. "2002"
9. "Obsessed"
10. "Unhealthy"
11. "Ciao Adios"
12. "Rockabye"
13. "Our Song"
14. "Irish Goodbye"
15. "Kills Me to Love You"
16. "Never Loved Anyone Before"

Act 3 – The Dance Floor

17. "Grudge"
18. "Haunt You"
19. "Friends"
20. "Don't Play"
21. "Better Off Alone/Insomnia Mix" (Dance break)
22. "Baby Don't Hurt Me"

Encore

23. "Psycho"

=== Leg 2 (Europe Summer 2024) ===
This setlist represents the set from the first show of the leg and may not represent the entirety of this leg.

1. "Alarm"
2. "Trainwreck"
3. "Cuckoo"
4. "Birthday"
5. "Beautiful"
6. "Perfect To Me"
7. "You & I"
8. "2002"
9. "Obsessed"
10. "Unhealthy"
11. "Cry Baby" (unreleased)
12. "Then"
13. "Our Song"
14. "Don't Leave Me Alone"
15. "Ciao Adios"
16. "Rockabye"
17. "Kiss My (Uh-Oh)"
18. "Friends"
19. "Don't Play"
20. "Baby Don't Hurt Me"

Encore

21. "Psycho"

=== Leg 3 (Asia 2024) ===
This setlist represents the set from the first show of the leg and may not represent the entirety of this leg.

1. "Alarm"
2. "Trainwreck"
3. "Cuckoo"
4. "Birthday"
5. "Beautiful"
6. "Perfect"
7. "You & I"
8. "Breathing"
9. "To Be Young"
10. "2002"
11. "Unhealthy"
12. "Cry Baby"
13. "Then"
14. "Our Song"
15. "Don't Leave Me Alone"
16. "Ciao Adios"
17. "Rockabye"
18. "Kiss My (Uh-Oh)"
19. "Friends"
20. "Don't Play"
21. "Baby Don't Hurt Me"

Encore

22. "Psycho"

== Tour dates ==
List of 2023 confirmed dates and venues
Date	City	Country	Venue	Opening acts
Europe 2023
14 November 2023	Amsterdam	Netherlands	AFAS Live	Leah Kate
16 November 2023	Cologne	Germany	E Werk	Leah Kate
18 November 2023	Paris	France	Olympia	Leah Kate
20 November 2023	Cardiff	Wales	Cardiff International Arena	Leah Kate, Evissimax
21 November 2023	Brighton	England	Brighton Centre	Leah Kate, Evissimax
23 November 2023	Dublin	Ireland	3Arena	Leah Kate, Evissimax
25 November 2023	Birmingham	England	Utilita Arena	Leah Kate, Evissimax
26 November 2023	Manchester	England	AO Arena	Leah Kate, Evissimax
29 November 2023	London	England	The O_{2} Arena	Leah Kate, Evissimax

List of 2024 confirmed dates and venues
Date	City	Country	Venue	Opening acts
Europe 2024 'Summer Run'
9 June 2024 (Note: This concert was part of the Parklife Festival)	Manchester	England	Heaton Park	—N/a
20 June 2024	Scarborough	England	Scarborough Open Air Theatre	Georgia
22 June 2024	Nottingham	England	Sherwood Pines	Devon, Mae Stephens
23 June 2024	Cornwall	England	The Wyldes	Charlotte Plank, Mae Stephens, Georgia
27 June 2024	Staffordshire	England	Cannock Chase	ADMT, Georgia
28 June 2024 (Note: This concert was part of the Glastonbury Festival)	Somerset	England	Worthy Farm	—N/a
4 July 2024	Leeds	England	Sound of the City	Georgia
5 July 2024	Gloucester	England	Westonbirt Arboretum	Devon, Georgia
27 July 2024 (Note: This concert was part of the Depot in the Castle)	Cardiff	Wales	Cardiff Castle	—N/a
28 July 2024	Ludlow	England	Ludlow Castle	Beth McCarthy, Caity Baser, Georgia
2 August 2024 (Note: This concert was part of the Suikerrock Festival)	Tienen	Belgium	Suikerrock	—N/a
11 August 2024 (Note: This concert was part of the Lokerse Feesten)	Lokeren	Belgium	Grote Kaai	—N/a
17 August 2024 (Note: This concert was part of the Findings Festival)	Oslo	Norway	Bislett Stadium	—N/a
31 August 2024 (Note: This concert was part of the Zurich Openair)	Zürich	Switzerland	Flughofstrasse	—N/a
Asia 2024
24 September 2024	Tokyo	Japan	Tokyo Garden Theater	—N/a
26 September 2024	Osaka	Japan	Zepp Namba	—N/a
28 September 2024	Manila	Philippines	The Podium Hall	—N/a
30 September 2024	Singapore		Capitol Theatre	—N/a
3 October 2024	Hong Kong		Macpherson Stadium	—N/a
5 October 2024 (Note: This concert was part of the Busan Rock Festival)	Busan (Note: Labelled as Seoul in promotional material.)	South Korea	Samnak Park	—N/a
7 October 2024	Taipei	Taiwan	Zepp New Taipei	—N/a
