= Cry Baby (Clean Bandit, Anne-Marie and David Guetta song) =

2024 single by Clean Bandit, Anne-Marie and David Guetta

Single by Clean Bandit, Anne-Marie and David Guetta
- Released: 9 August 2024
- Recorded: 2020
- Genre: EDM; dance-pop; house; synth-pop; disco
- Length: 2:37
- Label: B1 Recordings; Ministry of Sound Recordings
- Songwriters: Anne-Marie Nicholson; Jack Patterson; Camille Purcell; Steve Mac
- Producer: Clean Bandit

Clean Bandit singles chronology
"Mar Azul" (2024)	"Cry Baby" (2024)	"2s n 3s" (2024)

Anne-Marie singles chronology
"Coming Your Way" (2023)	"Cry Baby" (2024)	"Luv?" (2025)

David Guetta singles chronology
"Raving" (2024)	"Cry Baby" (2024)	"Never Going Home Tonight" (2024)

Music video
- "Cry Baby" on YouTube

"Cry Baby" is a song by English electronic group Clean Bandit, English singer Anne-Marie and French DJ David Guetta. It was released on 9 August 2024 by B1 Recordings and Ministry of Sound Recordings. The song was written by Anne-Marie, Jack Patterson, Camille Purcell, and Steve Mac, with the production being handled by Clean Bandit.

== Background ==
Clean Bandit, a band comprising Jack and Luke Patterson and Grace Chatto, became known for their signature sound of dance beats and chamber music and were signed to Atlantic Records. "Cry Baby" was written and recorded in 2020, four years before its release date. Anne-Marie sent the song to David Guetta, introducing him to Clean Bandit. The artists then worked on the song remotely on Zoom, as it was during the COVID-19 pandemic. Over the course of four years, they experimented on the song with the intention of trying to make it more country or sped-up, though the final version was one of the early versions of the song.

In the early 2020s, Atlantic put pressure on the band to adapt their sound, as they felt that songs needed to belong on Spotify dance music playlists. For several years, Clean Bandit's releases were darker and closer to house music, and were less successful. Eventually the band negotiated an exit from their label and joined Ministry of Sound Recordings, whose boss had been one of the first people to recommend them and who encouraged them to release the track.

== Promotion and release ==
Anne-Marie previewed "Cry Baby" at her Scarborough concert that was part of the Unhealthy Club Tour on 20 June 2024, and continued to perform it at further dates, including at Glastonbury Festival. The track was released on 9 August 2024 by B1 Recordings and Ministry of Sound Recordings as the lead single from Clean Bandit's upcoming third studio album, and was written by Anne-Marie, Jack Patterson, Camille Purcell, and Steve Mac, with the production being handled by Clean Bandit. The track addresses a breakup, with Anne-Marie instructing an ex-partner to "keep on crying", and features strings during the verses.

The song marked the third collaboration between Clean Bandit and Anne-Marie, following their 2016 number-one single "Rockabye" and Clean Bandit's album track "Should've Known Better", and the third one between Anne-Marie and David Guetta, who previously teamed up on "Don't Leave Me Alone" and "Baby Don't Hurt Me". "Cry Baby" is the first collaboration between Clean Bandit and David Guetta. The Official Charts Company, who listened to the track before it was released, wrote that there was "more than a little of a sea shanty" about the track, and described the song "as the purest melding of their trademark brand of orchestral dance-pop since their last UK Number 1 single, the brilliant Symphony with Zara Larsson".

== Music video ==
The music video for the song was released on the same day as the single. In the video, Anne-Marie embarks on a train journey driven by Jack and Luke Patterson after splitting from her disloyal partner while Grace Chatto serves tea and plays the cello. The Cry Baby Express train was built by Chatto's father. The video features appearances from Nigerian singer Ruger and train expert Francis Bourgeois.

The video was shot during seven days across several months due to its participants' busy schedules, with Guetta's contribution being filmed last, and was directed, produced and edited by Clean Bandit after production companies told Chatto that producing it would cost at least £250,000. Many of the sets were built by Chatto's father, a carpenter. In an interview with The Sun, Chatto revealed that the group were burgled while recording the music video in Ibiza, with €40,000 worth of equipment and cash stolen.

== Chart performance ==
In the United Kingdom, "Cry Baby" debuted at number 78 on the UK Singles Chart Top 100, peaking three weeks later at number 49. On the UK Singles Downloads Chart, the single debuted and peaked at number 23.

"Cry Baby" appeared, in total, on the charts of nineteen countries, including Lithuania (number 2 on the country's airplay chart), Poland (number 7 on the country's airplay chart), New Zealand (number 16 on the Hot Singles Chart), and the United States, where it peaked at number 40 on the Hot Dance/Electronic Songs Chart.

== Personnel ==
- Clean Bandit – production
- Anne-Marie – vocals
- David Guetta – additional production, mastering engineer, mixing engineer
- Cameron Gower-Poole – vocal producer
- Luke Patterson – programmer, drums
- Jack Patterson – bass, guitar, synthesizer, piano
- Grace Chatto – cello
- Neil Amin-Smith – violin
- Beatrice Philips – violin

== Charts ==
=== Weekly charts ===
Weekly chart performance for "Cry Baby"
Chart (2024–2025)	Peak position
Belarus Airplay (TopHit)	23
Belgium (Ultratop 50 Flanders)	23
CIS Airplay (TopHit)	26
Czech Republic Airplay (ČNS IFPI)	2
Denmark Airplay (Hitlisten)	15
Estonia Airplay (TopHit)	14
Hungary (Dance Top 40)	12
Hungary (Rádiós Top 40)	1
Kazakhstan Airplay (TopHit)	89
Latvia Airplay (TopHit)	11
Latvia Airplay (TopHit) David Guetta VIP Remix	25
Lithuania Airplay (TopHit)	2
Malta Airplay (Radiomonitor)	20
Moldova Airplay (TopHit)	51
Netherlands (Dutch Top 40)	10
Netherlands (Single Top 100)	85
New Zealand Hot Singles (RMNZ)	16
Nigeria (TurnTable Top 100)	99
Nigeria (TurnTable Top 100) Ruger Remix	54
North Macedonia Airplay (Radiomonitor)	1
Poland (Polish Airplay Top 100)	7
Romania Airplay (TopHit)	147
Russia Airplay (TopHit)	32
Serbia Airplay (Radiomonitor)	17
Slovakia Airplay (ČNS IFPI)	42
South Korea BGM (Circle)	57
Suriname (Nationale Top 40)	14
Sweden (Sverigetopplistan)	95
Ukraine Airplay (TopHit)	49
UK Singles (Official Charts)	49
US Hot Dance/Electronic Songs (Billboard)	40

=== Monthly charts ===
Monthly chart performance for "Cry Baby"
Chart (2024–2025)	Peak position
Belarus Airplay (TopHit)	25
CIS Airplay (TopHit)	42
Czech Republic (Rádio Top 100)	4
Estonia Airplay (TopHit)	15
Latvia Airplay (TopHit)	54
Latvia Airplay (TopHit) David Guetta VIP Remix	30
Lithuania Airplay (TopHit)	25
Russia Airplay (TopHit)	37
Slovakia (Rádio Top 100)	55
Ukraine Airplay (TopHit)	66

=== Year-end charts ===
Year-end chart performance for "Cry Baby"
Chart (2024)	Position
Belarus Airplay (TopHit)	142
CIS Airplay (TopHit)	137
Estonia Airplay (TopHit)	104
Hungary (Rádiós Top 40)	76
Netherlands (Dutch Top 40)	52
Poland (Polish Airplay Top 100)	83
Russia Airplay (TopHit)	197

2025 year-end chart performance for "Cry Baby"
Chart (2025)	Position
Belarus Airplay (TopHit)	86
Belgium (Ultratop 50 Flanders)	71
Hungary (Dance Top 40)	36
Hungary (Rádiós Top 40)	31

== Certifications ==
Certifications for "Cry Baby"
Region	Certification	Certified units/sales
United Kingdom (BPI)	Silver	200,000^{‡}
^{‡} Sales+streaming figures based on certification alone.

== Release history ==
Release dates for "Cry Baby"
Region	Date	Format	Version	Label	Ref.
Various	9 August 2024	Digital download; streaming	Original	B1 Recordings; Ministry of Sound Recordings	
Various	30 August 2024	Digital download; streaming	Extended	B1 Recordings; Ministry of Sound Recordings	
Various	6 September 2024	Digital download; streaming	KC Lights Remix	B1 Recordings; Ministry of Sound Recordings	
Various	13 September 2024	Digital download; streaming	David Guetta VIP Mix	B1 Recordings; Ministry of Sound Recordings	
Various	20 September 2024	Digital download; streaming	Ruger Remix	B1 Recordings; Ministry of Sound Recordings	
Various	4 October 2024	Digital download; streaming	Acoustic	B1 Recordings; Ministry of Sound Recordings	
Various	11 October 2024	Digital download; streaming	Remix Extended Versions	B1 Recordings; Ministry of Sound Recordings	
Various	18 October 2024	Digital download; streaming	Tanner Adell Remix	B1 Recordings; Ministry of Sound Recordings	
Various	25 October 2024	Digital download; streaming	Clean Bandit VIP Mix	B1 Recordings; Ministry of Sound Recordings	
Various	15 November 2024	Digital download; streaming	New Era Remix	B1 Recordings; Ministry of Sound Recordings	
