= Baby (Aitch and Ashanti song) =

Single by Aitch featuring Ashanti

from the album Close to Home
- Released: 10 March 2022
- Length: 2:57
- Label: Capitol UK
- Songwriters: Harrison Armstrong; Fred Gibson; Berwyn du Bois; Ashanti Douglas; Irving Lorenzo; Andre Parker; Benjy Gibson; Crooza
- Producers: Fred Again; Berwyn; Benjy Gibson; Crooza

Aitch singles chronology
"War" (2022)	"Baby" (2022)	"My G" (2022)

Ashanti singles chronology
"235 (2:35 I Want You)" (2021)	"Baby" (2022)	"Falling for You" (2022)

Music video
- "Baby" on YouTube

"Baby" is a song by British rapper Aitch and American singer Ashanti. The song was released on 10 March 2022 by Capitol Records, as the lead single from his debut album, Close to Home. Ashanti is credited on the song due to "Baby" heavily sampling her song "Rock wit U (Awww Baby)", from the album Chapter II (2003).

== Charts ==
Chart performance for "Baby"
Chart (2022)	Peak position
Australian Hip Hop/R&B Singles (ARIA)	27
Global Excl. U.S. (Billboard)	109
Ireland (IRMA)	5
UK Singles (Official Charts)	2
UK Hip Hop/R&B (Official Charts)	2

=== Year-end charts ===
2022 year-end chart performance for "Baby"
Chart (2022)	Position
UK Singles (Official Charts)	18

== Certifications ==
Region	Certification	Certified units/sales
Australia (ARIA)	Platinum	70,000^{‡}
New Zealand (RMNZ)	Gold	15,000^{‡}
United Kingdom (BPI)	Platinum	600,000^{‡}
^{‡} Sales+streaming figures based on certification alone.
