= Unhealthy (album) =

Studio album by Anne-Marie
- Released: 28 July 2023
- Genres: Pop; dance-pop
- Length: 32:05
- Labels: Major Tom's; Atlantic; Asylum
- Producers: Evan Blair; Billen Ted; Mojam; Connor McDonough; Riley McDonough

Anne-Marie chronology
Therapy (2021)	Unhealthy (2023)	If You're Looking for a New Best Friend (2025)

Singles from Unhealthy
- 1. "Psycho" Released: 15 September 2022; 2. "Sad Bitch" Released: 3 February 2023; 3. "Unhealthy" Released: 18 May 2023

Unhealthy is the third studio album by English singer-songwriter Anne-Marie. It was released on 28 July 2023, through Major Tom's, Asylum Records, and Atlantic Records. The album, a pop and dance-pop record, was produced by Mojam, who previously produced Anne-Marie's second studio album, Therapy (2023), Billen Ted, an opening act on Anne-Marie's Dysfunctional Tour for Therapy, siblings Connor and Riley McDonough, and Evan Blair. The album features guest appearances from American singer Khalid, British rapper Aitch, and Canadian singer Shania Twain, with reissues of the album featuring Thai singer Minnie from South Korean girl group (G)I-dle, French DJ David Guetta, and American rapper Coi Leray.

Unhealthy was preceded by three singles. The first, "Psycho" (featuring Aitch), was released on the 15th of September, 2022. It would chart at number 8 on the Irish Singles Chart, number 5 on the UK singles chart, and a peak at the top of the Sweden Heatseeker chart. It was also certified Platinum in the UK. The second single, "Sad Bitch", was released on the 3rd of February, 2023, and charted at number 65 on the UK singles chart. The title track and third and final single, "Unhealthy" (featuring Shania Twain), was released on the 18th of May, 2023. It would chart at number 18 on the UK singles chart and number 10 on the Irish Singles chart, whilst peaking within the top 10 in seven other countries, including a position at the top of the Rádio – Top 100 in Slovakia.

Unhealthy peaked at number 2 on the UK Albums Chart and became her best selling album to date in her homeland. The album also saw continued success in other charts including peaking at number 1 on the Scottish albums chart and at number 11 on the Irish albums chart, respectively. The album was also certified Silver by the British Phonographic Industry (BPI). To promote the album, Anne-Marie went on The Unhealthy Club Tour from 2023 to 2024, which included a leg of "Unhealthy Intimate Performances" in 2023.

== Background ==
Anne-Marie started working on her third studio album in 2022. While promoting her single "Psycho" with Aitch in September 2022 she revealed that she's been writing a lot of new stuff and figured out what she wants to say. The singer finished working on the album in January 2023. The record was written at four writing camps, including Decoy Studios in Suffolk. A total of 19 songs were written in a week, including pop, rock, country and musical songs. On 27 April 2023, Anne-Marie announced the title, release date, artwork and tracklist of her third album. On the same day, the singer met fans at Brick Lane in London, where she revealed billboards advertising "Unhealthy", which she later graffitied with black paint.

=== Production ===
On the Table Manners podcast, hosted by Jessie and Lennie Ware, Anne-Marie provided information about her third studio album. She explained that after the release of her second album and having weekly therapy sessions during lockdown, she began to feel numb to emotions. Because of this, she stopped talking to her therapist so often and as a result she started feeling completely different. This change inspired her third album:

"When I started therapy in lockdown, that's when I started writing the second album, so it was all very much about self improvement, you know, figuring out my brain and all those techniques my therapist was telling me. I felt like I went into therapy because I was quite numb to emotions and then I came out of therapy numb to emotions in another way. I just learned so much on how to understand everything and deal with things that I just didn't feel extreme anger, extreme sadness or extreme happiness anymore. I was back on the middle road. And I kinda missed those extremities again so I stopped therapy, I do it every now and again, but it was like a weekly thing for years. (...) So the second album was very much like that, you know, calm and collected. So in the process of this new album I just wanted to feel everything again."

She later added: "I basically have done a journey of two relationships: one which I came out of which wasn't great and then one which I've gone into which didn't start great because it was like an obsessiveness, unhealthiness and then at the end it kind of levels out. So it's like all of the phases of a relationship that you could imagine is put into the album."

==== Title and artwork ====
The album title was inspired by her food dietries and the fact that she is an obsessive person and most of her thoughts are unhealthy. Talking about the writing process Anne-Marie said: "I definitely feel like I was less scared to experiment with stuff on this one. I feel like in the last two albums I've definitely felt a way about staying in a lane, like if I don't sound like this or if I don't make a song that sounds like this, are they gonna know it's Anne-Marie? I definitely think my label and people around me were a bit worried about me going 'I'm gonna try new stuff'. (...) It's not as if I've changed completely, it just feels like every song had a freedom to just be whatever it wanted to be."

During the interview on The One Show, Anne-Marie explained the story behind the picture that was chosen for the album cover: "When I got into the industry, I felt a way about being a pop star and what I'm supposed to look like. Whether it's like make-up and fake nails and all this stuff. And with my other albums I've kind of done that and I've got nails on, and you know, all of that stuff. And in this one I just thought 'No, I'm going to be me.' So I found my shower door and pushed my face up against it."

== Promotion ==
=== The Unhealthy Club Tour ===
The Unhealthy Club Tour is the third headlining tour by English singer-songwriter Anne-Marie, in support of her third studio album Unhealthy (2023). Comprising 29 shows across three legs, the first leg officially began on 14 November 2023, in Amsterdam, Netherlands, and came to an end on 29 November 2023 at The O2 Arena in London, UK. The second leg began on 20 June 2024, in Scarborough, UK, while the third leg began on 24 September 2024 in Tokyo, Japan.

==== "Unhealthy Intimate Performances" ====
Unhealthy Intimate Performances
- Tour by Anne-Marie
- Location: UK
- Associated album: Unhealthy
- Start date: 26 July 2023
- End date: 23 September 2023
- No. of shows: 15

On 23 June 2023, Anne-Marie announced six intimate shows across UK in support of Unhealthy. The tickets went on sale on 27 June at 12 pm BST. On 30 June, the singer added another two shows in Kingston and Bristol due to high demand. On 4 July 2023, Anne-Marie announced that on 28 July, the release day of her album, she will do an intimate performance in London as part of the YouTube Music Nights. Tickets for the event did not go on sale, instead for a chance to attend, the copy of Unhealthy had to be pre-ordered from the artist's official store. On 11 July 2023, a show in Southampton was announced. During the album release week 4 additional shows were added.

List of confirmed dates and venues
Date	City	Country	Venue	Show time	Retailer
26 July 2023	Kingston	England	Pryzm	5pm BST	Banquet
26 July 2023	Kingston	England	Pryzm	7pm BST	Banquet
28 July 2023	London	England	Lafayette	7pm BST	-
30 July 2023	Brighton	England	Chalk	6pm BST	Resident
31 July 2023	Leeds	England	The Wardrobe	7pm BST	Crash Records
1 August 2023	Coventry	England	hmv Empire	7pm BST	HMV
2 August 2023	Bristol	England	The Fleece	4pm BST	Rough Trade
2 August 2023	Bristol	England	The Fleece	7pm BST	Rough Trade
3 August 2023	Liverpool	England	The Cavern Club	7pm BST	Jacardana
15 August 2023	Kingston	England	Pryzm	7pm BST	Banquet
16 August 2023	Southampton	England	The 1865	7pm BST	Vinilo
18 September 2023	Glasgow	Scotland	SWG3	7pm BST	Assai Records
22 September 2023	Dundee	Scotland	Fat Sam's	5pm BST	Assai Records
22 September 2023	Dundee	Scotland	Fat Sam's	7pm BST	Assai Records
23 September 2023	Southend-on-Sea	England	Cliffs Pavilion	7pm BST	Crash Records

=== Colouring-in room ===
On 10 July 2023, Anne-Marie announced that she would invite fans on 19 July 2023 into a room in East London to colour the walls with her if they pre-saved Unhealthy in the next 48 hours from her official store. Tickets did not go officially on sale, but instead, fans would get invites if they pre-ordered the copy of Unhealthy.

== Critical reception ==
Professional ratings
Review scores
Source	Rating
Clash	4/10
Evening Standard	4/5 stars
The Guardian	3/5 stars
IZM	2.5/5 stars
The Line of Best Fit	5/10
NME	2.5/5 stars

For Clash, Tamzin Kraftman wrote that "with repetitive melodic motifs and overcooked themes, Anne-Marie had a chance to offer a profound perspective but settled for the mundane." Evening Standard's David Smyth described Unhealthy as "very much a radio-friendly pop album". Tanatat Khuttapan of The Line of Best Fit wrote that "Anne-Marie's true control of the narrative is via honest intercommunication; Unhealthy realises it a little too late, perhaps impeded by the poor decisions that appear to be hers." Writing for NME, Sophie Williams said that "Anne-Marie's goal of making pop that represents the most intimate, darkest of feelings is admirable but not always effective. It's not exactly clear what message she's pining for." Reviewing for The Guardian, Tara Joshi described the album as "broadly a fun record that's pushing to be more raw and upfront than she [Anne-Marie] has managed before", and adding that "Anne-Marie does sound freer and more playful in her own right, toying with more ambitious instrumentation (rock, orchestral) alongside the dance-pop and ballads."

== Commercial performance ==
=== United Kingdom ===
In its first charting week, Unhealthy opened at number-two on the UK Albums Chart with sales of 23,778, of which 19,778 were physical copies, marking it her best selling album in the country. It secured the highest weekly sale for an album by a UK female soloist since Florence and the Machine's Dance Fever topped the chart in May 2022. It was also certified Silver by the British Phonographic Industry (BPI) for equivalent sales of 60,000 units in the country.

=== Internationally ===
In Belgium, the album charted at number 166 on the Ultratop chart in Wallonia and number 38 on the same chart in Flanders. In France, the album charted at number 72 on the French Albums Chart. In Hungary, the album charted at number 11 on the Hungarian Physical Albums chart. It also charted at number 11 on Ireland's Irish Albums Chart. The album's highest peak on any chart was at the top of the Scottish Albums Chart in Scotland.

== Track listing ==
Unhealthy track listing
No.	Title	Writer(s)	Producer(s)	Length
1.	"Sucks to Be You"	Anne-Marie Nicholson; Conor Blake; James Murray; Mustafa Omer; Sara Boe	Mojam	0:43
2.	"Sad Bitch"	Nicholson; Evan Blair; Samuel Brennan; Tom Hollings; Nami Ondas; Taylor Upsahl	Blair; Billen Ted	2:12
3.	"Psycho" (with Aitch)	Nicholson; Harrison Armstrong; Grace Barker; Brennan; Hollings; Tom Mann; Henry Tucker	Billen Ted; Mojam	2:42
4.	"Haunt You"	Nicholson; Boe; Tre Jean-Marie; Blake; Brennan; Hollings	Billen Ted	2:53
5.	"Trainwreck"	Nicholson; Camille Purcell; Philip Plested; Brennan; Hollings	Billen Ted	3:03
6.	"Grudge"	Nicholson; Tyron Frampton; Blake; Blair; Ondas	Blair	2:12
7.	"Obsessed"	Nicholson; Ondas; Blair; Madi Yanofsky; Lionel Bart	Blair	2:26
8.	"Kills Me to Love You"	Nicholson; Blake; Brennan; Boe; Hollings	Billen Ted	2:22
9.	"Unhealthy" (featuring Shania Twain)	Nicholson; Joel Castillo; Connor McDonough; Riley McDonough	C. McDonough; R. McDonough	2:29
10.	"Irish Goodbye"	Nicholson; Tucker; Brennan; Hollings; Frampton	Billen Ted	2:09
11.	"Cuckoo"	Nicholson; Blake; Tucker; Brennan; Hollings	Billen Ted	2:35
12.	"You & I" (featuring Khalid)	Nicholson; Blake; Murray; Purcell; Khalid Robinson; Omer	Mojam; Risc	3:25
13.	"Never Loved Anyone Before"	Nicholson; Ondas; Blair; Upsahl	Blair; Ondas	2:54
Total length:				32:05

Deluxe edition bonus tracks
No.	Title	Writer(s)	Producer(s)	Length
14.	"Better Off"	Nicholson; Barker; Andrew Murray; Omer; Murray; Tucker	Mojam	2:49
15.	"Ick"	Nicholson; Blake; Brennan; Boe; Hollings	Billen Ted	2:52
16.	"Expectations" (with Minnie from (G)I-dle)	C Sa; Kim Jonghan; Lim Jung Woo; Paprikaa; Taylor Glasby	Paprikaa	3:09
Total length:				40:55

Japanese CD edition bonus tracks
No.	Title	Writer(s)	Producer(s)	Length
17.	"Psycho" (acoustic)	Nicholson; Armstrong; Barker; Brennan; Hollings; Mann; Tucker	Duncan Brookfield	2:21
18.	"Sad Bitch" (acoustic)	Nicholson; Blair; Brennan; Hollings; Ondas; Upsahl	Brookfield	2:14
19.	"Unhealthy" (acoustic)	Nicholson; Castle; C. McDonough; R. McDonough	Brookfield	2:26
Total length:				47:56

Super Unhealthy digital edition bonus track (Disc 1)
No.	Title	Writer(s)	Producer(s)	Length
14.	"Baby Don't Hurt Me" (with David Guetta and Coi Leray)	Akil King; Nicholson; Coi Leray Collins; David Guetta; Tony Hendrik; Ed Sheeran; Feli Ferraro; Johnny McDaid; Junior Torello; Mike Hawkins; Steve Mac; Tobias Frederiksen	Guetta; Johnny Goldstein; Hawkins; Toby Green	2:20

=== Notes ===
- "Unhealthy" does not feature Shania Twain on the LP version of the album.
- All song titles excluding "Expectations" and "Baby Don't Hurt Me" are stylised in all caps.
- The Super Unhealthy digital edition of Unhealthy includes voice notes of all the standard edition songs, listed under a second disc.
- "Obsessed" contains elements of "I'd Do Anything", written by Lionel Bart, as performed in Oliver!.
- "Baby Don't Hurt Me" samples "What Is Love", written by Tony Hendrik and Karin van Haaren, as performed by Haddaway.

== Personnel ==
Credits adapted from Tidal.

=== Musicians ===
- Anne-Marie – vocals (all tracks)
- Mojam - programming (1, 12, 14)
- Evan Blair - keyboards, synthesizer, drum programming (2); programming (2, 6, 7, 13)
- Samuel Brennan - percussion, drums, synthesizer, bass programming (2); drum programming, piano (3), programming (2, 4, 5, 8, 10, 11, 15)
- Tom Hollings - drums, synthesizer, bass programming (2); percussion (2, 3); bass, percussion programming (3); programming (2, 4, 5, 8, 10, 11, 15)
- Aitch - vocals (3)
- Slowthai - backing vocals (6)
- Shania Twain - vocals (9)
- Connor McDonough - programming (9)
- Riley McDonough - programming (9)
- Khalid - vocals (12)
- Kamille - backing vocals (12)
- Felix Stephens - cello (10,12)
- Nina Lim - violin (12)
- Rics - programming (12)
- Andrea Cozzaglio - strings programming (12); drums programming (13)
- Liam Toon - drums (13)
- Travis Sayles - programming (13)
- Nami Ondas - programming (13)
- Minnie - vocals (16)
- Paprikaa - programming (16)
- Duncan Brookfield - bass, guitar, percussion, piano (17); programming (17, 18)

=== Technical ===
- Stuart Hawkes – masterer (1-15, 18)
- Joe Burgess - assistant mixer (1-15, 18)
- Niko Battistini - assistant mixer (1-15, 18)
- Geoff Swan - mixer (1-8, 10-15, 18, 19)
- Connor McDonough - mixer, engineer (9)
- Riley McDonough - mixer, engineer (9)
- Mojam - engineer (1, 3, 12, 14,); vocal recording engineer (1, 12)
- Evan Blair - engineer (2, 6, 7, 13); vocal recording engineer (7, 13)
- Bob MacKenzie - engineer (3)
- Dom Shaw - engineer (3)
- Katie May - engineer (3)
- Billen Ted - engineer (3-5, 8, 10, 11, 15); vocal recording engineer (4, 5, 8, 11)
- Cameron Gower Poole - vocal recording engineer (6, 10, 13, 19); mixer (17)
- Mark Ralph - vocal recording engineer (9)
- Mark "Spike" Stent - vocal recording engineer (9)
- Samuel Brennan - vocal recording engineer (10)
- Kay One - vocal recording engineer (16)
- Andrea Cozzaglio - strings recording engineer (12); drums recording engineer (13)
- Duncan Brookfield - mixer (17)
- Dick Beetham - masterer (17)
- Jeremy Cooper - masterer (19)
- Bankz - additional vocal recording engineer (3)

=== Artwork ===
- Slowthai - photography
- Will Beach - photography
- Elliott Elder - design

== Charts ==
Chart performance for Unhealthy
Chart (2023)	Peak position
Belgian Albums (Ultratop Flanders)	38
Belgian Albums (Ultratop Wallonia)	166
French Albums (SNEP)	72
Hungarian Physical Albums (MAHASZ)	11
Irish Albums (Official Charts)	11
Scottish Albums (Official Charts)	1
UK Albums (Official Charts)	2

== Certifications ==
Region	Certification	Certified units/sales
United Kingdom (BPI)	Silver	60,000^{‡}
^{‡} Sales+streaming figures based on certification alone.

== Release history ==
Release dates and formats for Unhealthy
Region	Date	Format	Edition	Label	Ref.
Various	28 July 2023	CD; cassette; digital download; LP; streaming	Standard	Major Tom's; Atlantic; Asylum	
Various	28 July 2023	CD; digital download; streaming	Deluxe	Major Tom's; Atlantic; Asylum	
Japan	28 July 2023	CD	Japan bonus	Warner Music Japan	
Various	31 July 2023	Digital download; streaming	Voicenote edition	Major Tom's; Atlantic; Asylum	
Various	2 August 2023	Digital download	Karaoke edition	Major Tom's; Atlantic; Asylum	
