= Anne-Marie =

English singer (born 1990)

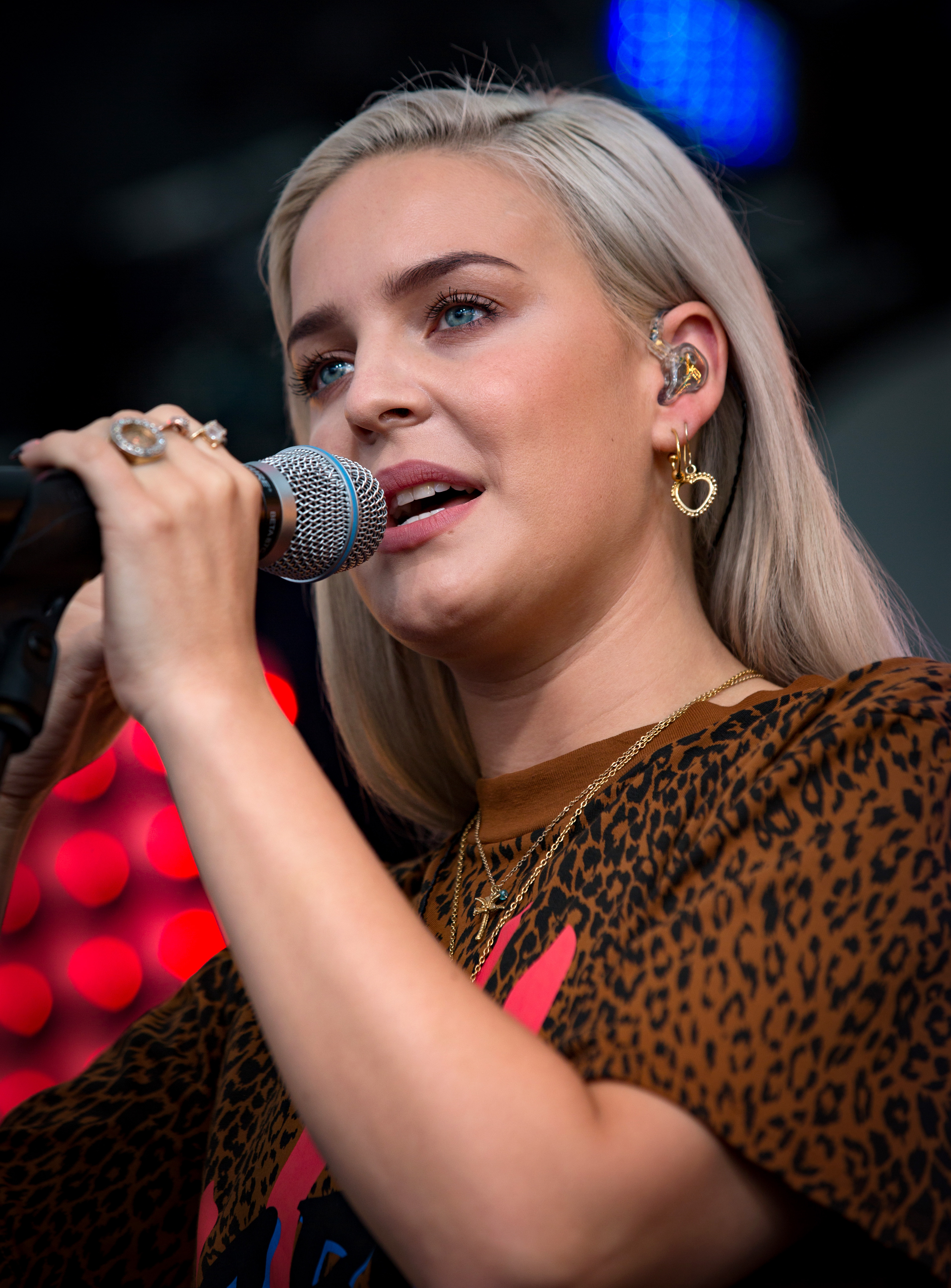
- Anne-Marie in 2017
- Born: Anne-Marie Rose Nicholson; 7 April 1990 (age 36) (Note: While most sources give a birth year of 1991, Anne-Marie was 12 years old when she competed in the 2002 FSKA World Championships in Las Vegas, which indicates she was born in 1990. Furthermore, England & Wales Civil Registration Birth Index notes her birth year as 1990, and her corporate filings in the United Kingdom also note a birth date of 1990.); East Tilbury, Essex, England
- Occupations: Singer; songwriter
- Years active: 2013–present
- Works: Discography
- Spouse: Slowthai (m. 2022)
- Children: 2
- Musical career
- Genre: Pop
- Instrument: Vocals
- Labels: Asylum; Warner Music; Atlantic
- Website: iamannemarie.com

Anne-Marie Rose Nicholson (born 7 April 1990) is an English singer and songwriter. She has achieved commercial success with songs "Alarm" (2016), "Ciao Adios" (2017), "Friends" (2018), "2002" (2018), "Rewrite The Stars" (2018), "Don't Play" (2021), "Kiss My (Uh-Oh)" (2021), "Psycho" (2022), "Baby Don't Hurt Me" (2023), and "Unhealthy" (2023). She was featured on Clean Bandit's "Rockabye" (2016), which peaked at number one in twenty-seven territories, including the United Kingdom. She has released 3 albums: Speak Your Mind (2018), which peaked at number three on the UK Albums Chart, Therapy (2021), and Unhealthy (2023), both of which peaked at number two on the UK Albums Chart.

Anne-Marie was nominated for four awards at the 2019 Brit Awards, including Best British Female Solo Artist. To date she has been nominated for ten Brit Awards and has also received a nomination for a Billboard Music Award and a Grammy Award. She has been signed to Asylum Records since 2015. From 2021 to 2023, Anne-Marie appeared as a coach on the television singing competition The Voice UK.

== Early life ==
Anne-Marie Rose Nicholson was born on 7 April 1990 in East Tilbury, Essex. Her mother is a local teacher and her father is a builder and handyman from the East End of London. She has an older sister named Samantha.

When she was five, Anne-Marie went to stage school. She appeared in two West End productions as a child: she auditioned for Les Misérables aged six, without telling her parents, and performed in Whistle Down the Wind with Jessie J when she was twelve.

Anne-Marie attended St Clere's School at Stanford-le-Hope, where she was involved in performing arts. Her initial popularity there ended when she was fourteen—she was shunned and bullied by her classmates after being accused of cheating on her boyfriend, when she had only spoken to another boy on the phone late at night. Anne-Marie also said she regrets being a difficult child—exacerbated by her grandmother's death when she was twelve—and was advised by Ed Sheeran to "call [her] mum and dad every day". She began filming herself singing in her room as a teenager. Anne-Marie went on to go to Palmer's College in Thurrock.

Anne-Marie is a black belt in Shotokan karate. She began taking lessons aged nine, and became a triple world champion, winning double gold in the Funakoshi Shotokan Karate Association World Championships in 2002, and further gold and silver in 2007; as well as gold in the United Kingdom Traditional Karate Federation National Championships. She credits karate with teaching her the "discipline and focus" necessary for her singing career, but tours have made it difficult for her to find time for the sport.

== Career ==
=== 2013–2015: Career beginnings and Karate ===
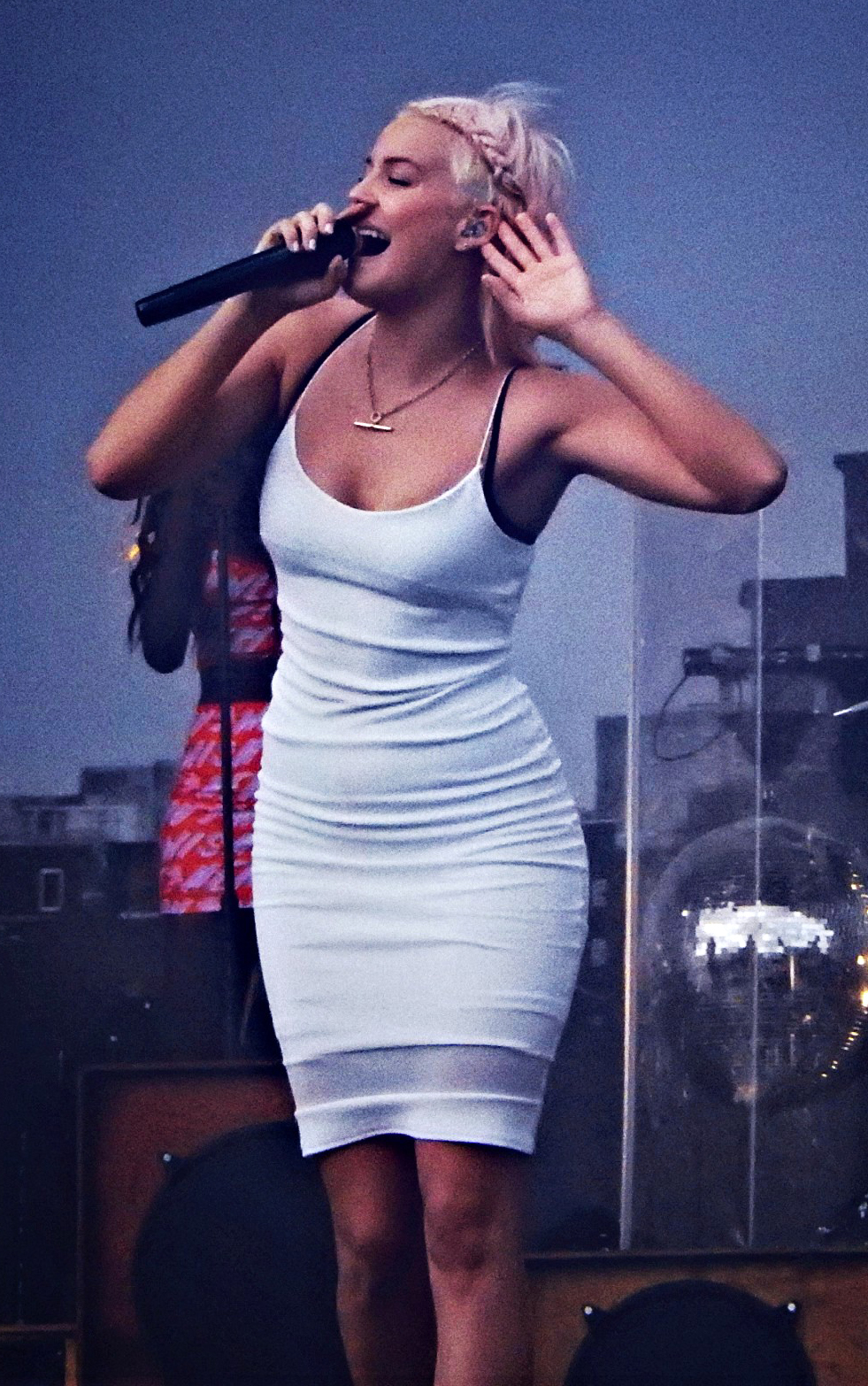
Anne-Marie performing with Rudimental at V Festival 2014

After a chance meeting, Anne-Marie secured recording time in Rocket Studios, owned by Elton John, which signed her to a recording contract after hearing her sing. On Rocket, she released the demo "Summer Girl" in 2013. It attracted attention when Ed Sheeran linked to it on his Twitter account. A possible solo career was curtailed for her to develop herself as an artist. After guest appearances on songs by Magnetic Man, Gorgon City, and Raized by Wolves, she gained the attention of Rudimental, and in 2014 she was asked to replace a vocalist who left the band. Anne-Marie then spent two years touring with Rudimental as a vocalist. She also featured on four tracks on their second album We the Generation (2015), including co-features with Dizzee Rascal and Will Heard, and "Rumour Mill", which reached number 67 on the UK Singles Chart and gave her enough confidence to go solo. She said that she was writing daily while touring.

Anne-Marie's debut extended play (EP), Karate EP, was released on 10 June 2015, under Rudimental's then-new label Major Tom's. Produced by Josh Record and Two Inch Records, it contained three tracks and a remix. Debut single "Karate" and "Gemini" led to Anne-Marie making her first solo live performances. The Guardian favorably reviewed "Boy" and opined that Karate "proves she's ready to step out alone". She released the single "Do It Right" in November, which peaked at number 90 on the UK Singles Chart and was certified platinum in Australia.

=== 2016–2018: Speak Your Mind ===
Her debut album had the working title of Breathing Fire. In May 2016, Anne-Marie released "Alarm", the first single from her debut album. It spent one week at number 76 in June before resurfacing a month later; it later peaked at number 16 and was certified double platinum in the UK. In October 2016, Anne-Marie was confirmed to play at the 31st edition of Eurosonic Noorderslag in Groningen, Netherlands. On 10 October 2016, Anne-Marie featured on Illy's song "Catch 22". The same month, Clean Bandit released their song "Rockabye", with Anne-Marie as main vocalist and featuring Jamaican rapper Sean Paul. It spent nine consecutive weeks at number one and gained the coveted Christmas number one. The song has since been certified multi-platinum across most of Europe, North America and Oceania. The Official Charts Company ranked "Rockabye" as the 57th biggest song of the decade (2010–2019) in the UK.

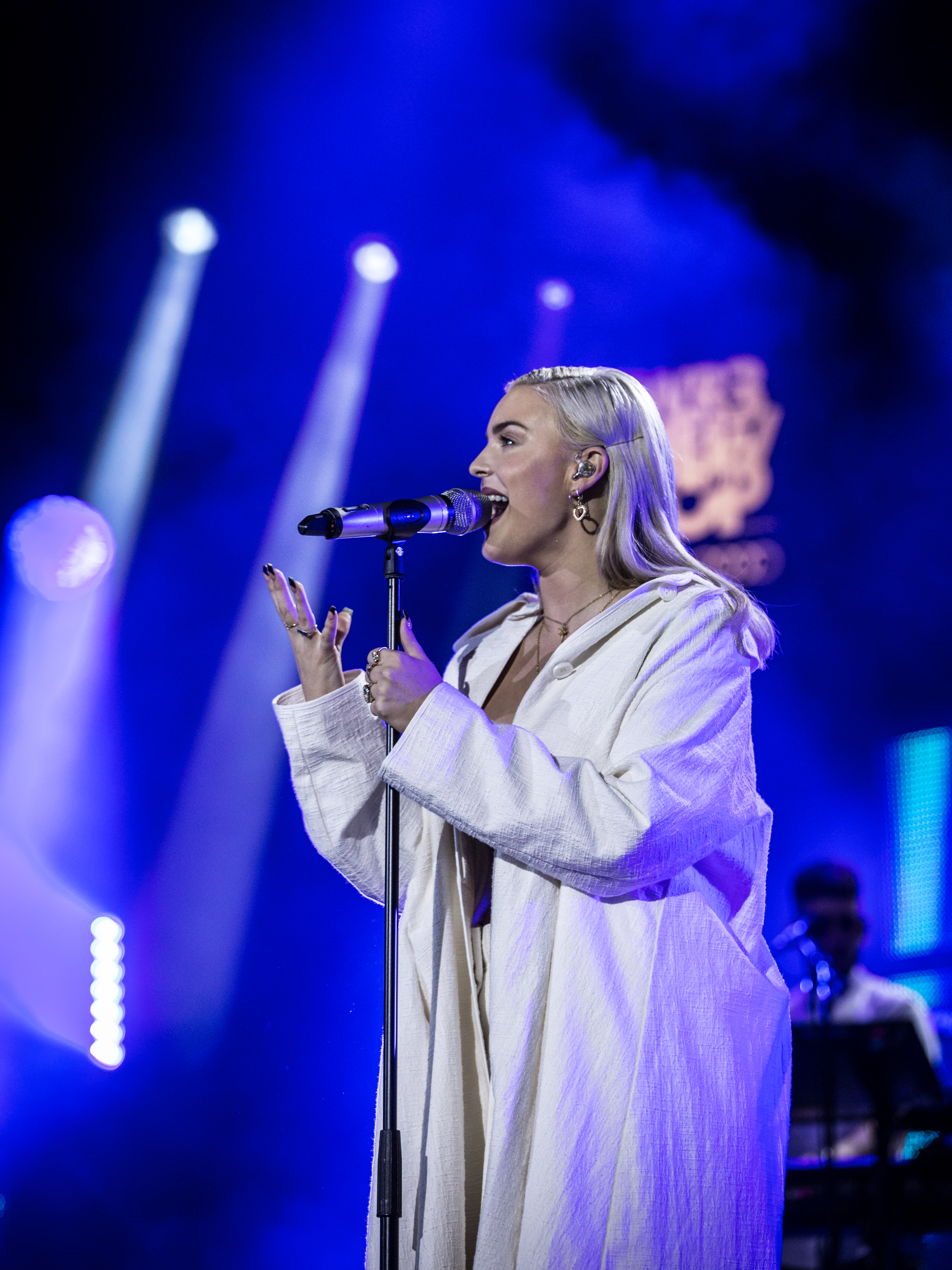
Anne-Marie performing at the SWR3 New Pop Festival in 2017

In March 2017, Anne-Marie released "Ciao Adios", which she had previously performed live at KOKO on 28 November 2016. The single became a top 10 hit in the UK, charting at number nine and being certified double platinum by the BPI. In May 2017, Anne-Marie teamed up with Nick Jonas and Mike Posner on the single "Remember I Told You". Anne-Marie's next single saw her collaborate with Snakehips on "Either Way", which also featured Joey Badass. In September 2017, Anne-Marie released "Heavy", followed by "Then" on 15 December. In 2018, Anne-Marie collaborated with Marshmello on "Friends". The song was released on 9 February 2018, and was Anne-Marie's second top five UK hit as a lead artist. According to the International Federation of the Phonographic Industry (IFPI), "Friends" was the ninth best-selling single of 2018 with sales of 9.6 million track-equivalent units.

Anne-Marie's debut studio album, Speak Your Mind, was released on 27 April 2018. Prior to the release of her album, Anne-Marie released the single "2002" on 20 April in response to constant urging by Ed Sheeran, the co-creator of the song. "2002" became one of Anne-Marie's most successful singles worldwide. It peaked at number 3 on the UK Singles Chart, where it spent 47 non-consecutive weeks. In South Korea, the song topped the country's year-end chart in 2019, making Anne-Marie the first and only foreign artist to achieve this feat. That same year, "2002" was also the most-streamed song on the Korean music streaming service Melon. As of March 2023, "2002" is the fourth-longest-charting song in Melon history (145 weeks), and the only non-Korean song to surpass 350 million streams on the platform.

Her debut album, Speak Your Mind, was a commercial success, peaking at number 3 on the UK Albums Chart and charting in 22 other countries. It has since been certified Platinum in the UK and remained on the chart for a total of 102 non-consecutive weeks. Speak Your Mind was also the biggest debut album by a British artist in 2018. On 15 June 2018, Anne-Marie teamed up with Rudimental and Major Lazer on a song "Let Me Live", which also featured Mr Eazi. In July 2018, Anne-Marie featured on a David Guetta song titled "Don't Leave Me Alone", which peaked at 18 on the UK Singles chart.

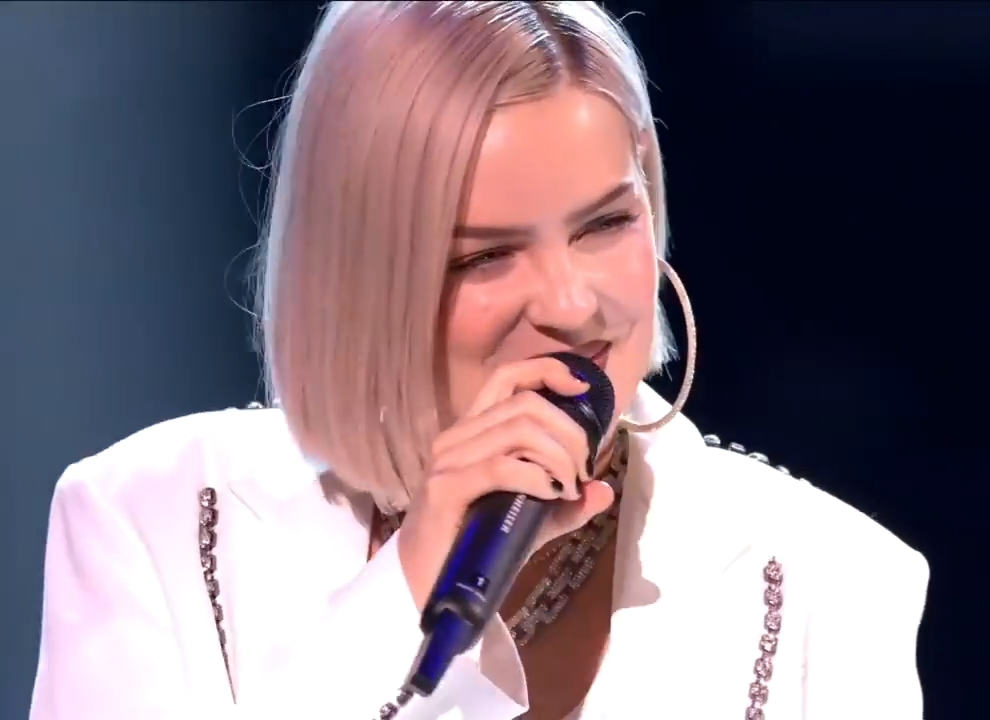
Anne-Marie performing "Friends" at the MTV Europe Music Awards 2018

In November 2018, Anne-Marie released the single "Perfect To Me", which was a remixed and retitled version of her song "Perfect" from her debut album. On 4 November, Anne-Marie and Marshmello performed an acoustic version of "Friends" at the 2018 MTV Europe Music Awards. The same month, Anne-Marie and James Arthur recorded "Rewrite the Stars" from The Greatest Showman for the re-recording of its soundtrack, The Greatest Showman: Reimagined.

=== 2019–2021: The Voice UK, single releases and Therapy ===
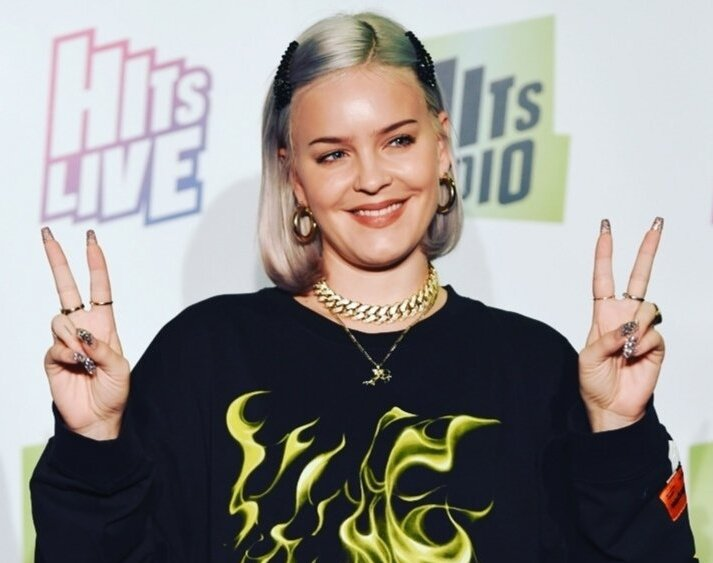
Anne-Marie in 2019

Following the release of her debut album in 2018, Anne-Marie began working on her next album. In an interview at the Brit Awards 2019, she stated that the album had been finished. However, it was ultimately scrapped later that year.

In June 2019, Anne-Marie performed her first solo set on the Pyramid Stage at the Glastonbury Festival 2019. In August 2019, Lauv released the single "Fuck, I'm Lonely", featuring Anne-Marie, for the soundtrack of 13 Reasons Why: Season 3. Anne-Marie released the song "Birthday" on 7 February 2020. On Mother's Day 2020, Anne-Marie released the song "Her". In May 2020, Anne-Marie featured on a remix of "This City" by Sam Fischer. "To Be Young", was released on 17 July, featuring American rapper Doja Cat. On 28 August, Anne-Marie featured on the Rudimental song "Come Over", alongside Tion Wayne. On 12 November, Anne-Marie released the single "Problems". On the same day, her documentary, How To Be Anne-Marie, was released on YouTube Originals. The documentary gives light to the fans and a closer look about her personal life and her "time away from the limelight". Her documentary also features fellow celebrities, including Little Mix.

On 2 January 2021, she made her first appearance as the newest coach for the tenth series of The Voice UK, replacing Meghan Trainor. A member of her team, Craig Eddie, won series 10, giving Anne-Marie her first win on her first series as a coach. Anne-Marie spent the next two years as the coach, with the twelfth series, aired in 2023, being her last.

On 15 January, Anne-Marie released the single "Don't Play" in collaboration with British YouTuber and rapper-singer KSI and English DJ and producer Digital Farm Animals as the lead single from her second studio album. Anne-Marie contributed vocals on the song "Way Too Long" in collaboration with Nathan Dawe and MoStack on 9 April. The same month, she teamed up with Singaporean singer JJ Lin on a song "Bedroom" from his EP, Like You Do. On 13 May, Anne-Marie announced the single "Our Song" with Niall Horan as the third single from her upcoming second studio album. The song was released on 21 May. On 12 July, Anne-Marie released the track "Beautiful". The music video for the song retold the life of the Syrian refugee and parathlete Dima Aktaa. On 23 July, Anne-Marie released the single "Kiss My (Uh-Oh)" as the fourth single, featuring Little Mix and released the album Therapy. It peaked at number 2 on the UK Albums Chart.

On 30 September, Anne-Marie released her first book "You Deserve Better: An Imperfect Guide To Finding Your Own Happiness". The book was published by Orion Spring and was a Sunday Times bestseller. As of 8 February 2022, the book has sold over 10 000 copies. The Korean version of the book was published on 23 February 2022 and was the only official translation.

In November 2021 it was announced she would dance with Graziano Di Prima in the 2021 Strictly Come Dancing Christmas Special, which she went on to win. The same month, Anne-Marie and Niall Horan released a cover of Fleetwood Mac's song "Everywhere" for the BBC Children in Need alongside other British musicians, including Ed Sheeran and Yungblud.

=== 2022–2024: Unhealthy, features in other artists' songs ===
On 8 February 2022, Anne-Marie performed a medley of "Kiss My (Uh-Oh)" and "Don't Play" at the 42nd Brit Awards. At the beginning of her performance, she stumbled while descending the steps to the stage but continued singing. Following the performance, she was praised by fans for her quick recovery. Anne-Marie's fall was described as one of the most talked-about moments of the 2022 Brit Awards ceremony. Talking to The Standard amid the premiere of the eleventh series of The Voice, Anne-Marie revealed that she had torn a tendon as a result of the fall.

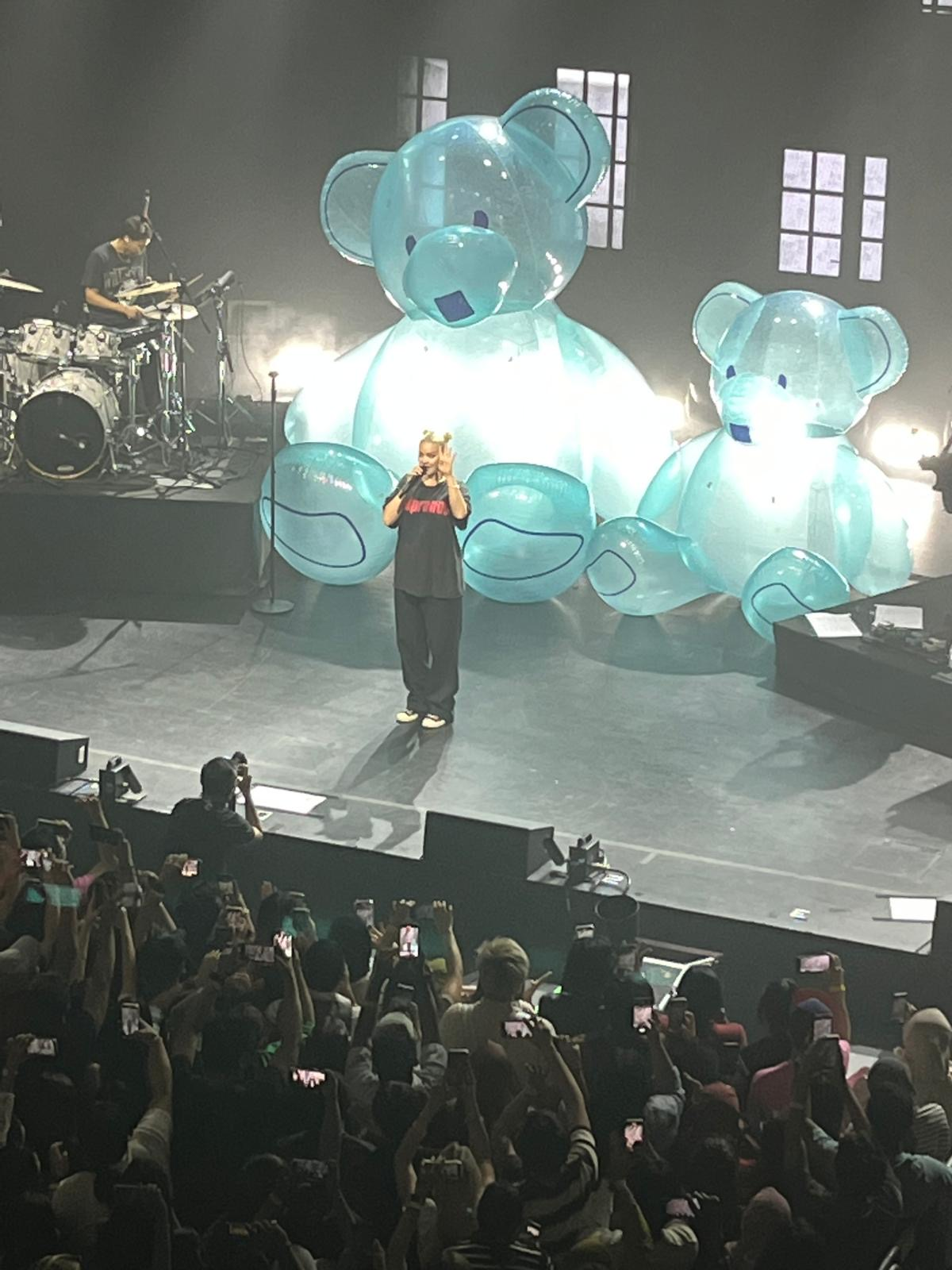
Anne-Marie performing at Capitol Theatre, Singapore in October 2022

In May 2022, Anne-Marie collaborated with Swedish DJ duo Neiked and American rapper Latto on the song "I Just Called" On 19 August, Anne-Marie featured on the remix of Diljit Dosanjh's single "Peaches", while on 26 August, Seventeen's new version of their song "_World" featuring Anne-Marie was released. On 16 September, Anne-Marie released the single "Psycho", in collaboration with British rapper Aitch, as the lead single from her third studio album. The song interpolates Mambo No. 5 (A Little Bit of...)" by Lou Bega, and peaked at number 5 on the UK Singles Chart.

In an interview with FM104 regarding her third studio album, Anne-Marie explained that "I've been writing a lot of new stuff... and I feel like I've figured out what I want to say. I feel like from the first and second album I've learnt a lot about myself, and know this is now who I am."

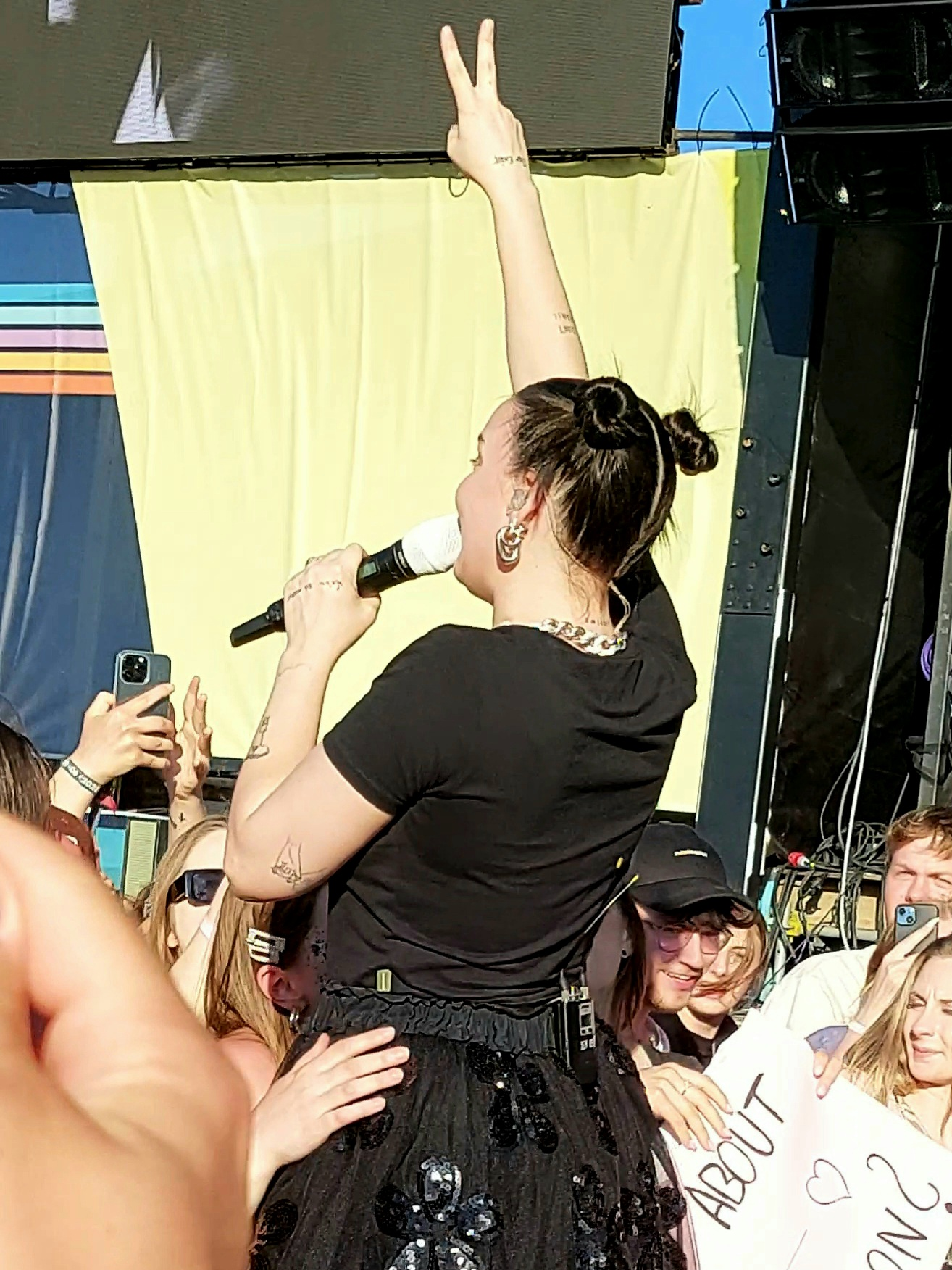
Anne-Marie performing at the Open'er Festival in 2023

In February 2023, Anne-Marie released "Sad Bitch" as the second single from her upcoming third studio album. In March 2023, Anne-Marie collaborated with Thai singer Minnie, a member of South Korean girl group (G)I-dle, on the song "Expectations". In April 2023, Anne-Marie teamed up with David Guetta and Coi Leray on the song "Baby Don't Hurt Me", which samples Haddaway's hit "What Is Love". On 27 April, Anne-Marie announced that her third album Unhealthy would be released on 28 July. The title track from the album, featuring Shania Twain, was released on 18 May 2023. The same month, she received the Brit Billion Award for achieving over one billion digital streams in the United Kingdom. On 5 July, Anne-Marie released "Trainwreck". Unhealthy peaked at number 2 on the UK Albums Chart, making it her third consecutive album to debut inside the top 3 in the UK. With first-week sales of 23,778 copies, it secured the highest weekly sale for an album by a UK female solo artist since Florence and the Machine's Dance Fever topped the chart in May 2022. On 16 August, Anne-Marie collaborated with Haitian DJ Michaël Brun and American singer Becky G on the single "Coming Your Way". "Christmas Without You" was released exclusively on Amazon Music on 7 November as part of the soundtrack for Your Christmas or Mine 2. The same month, Anne-Marie earned her first Grammy nomination for the song Baby Don't Hurt Me.

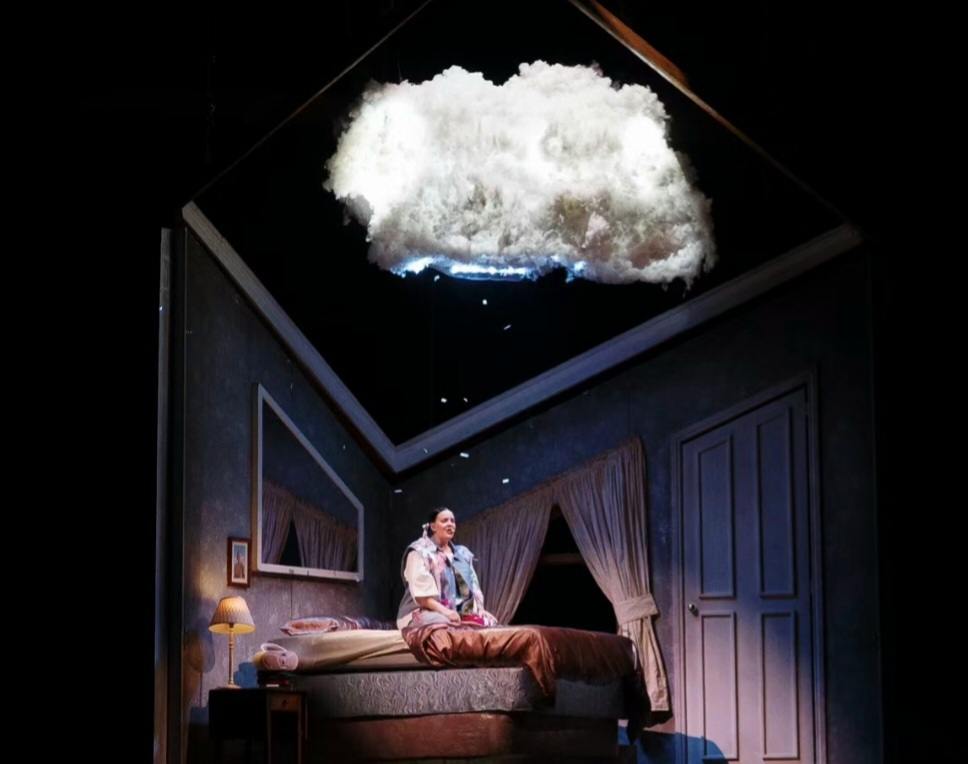
Anne-Marie performing at the Utilita Arena Birmingham during The Unhealthy Club Tour in November 2023

Following the conclusion of the first leg of The Unhealthy Club Tour, Anne-Marie took a break from her career commitments for several months as she welcomed her first child in February 2024. In May, she teamed up with Nicholas Galitzine on the song "The Idea of You", which was featured on the soundtrack of the film of the same name. In June 2024, she performed at the Glastonbury Festival for the second time. On 9 August, Anne-Marie released the single "Cry Baby" in collaboration with Clean Bandit and David Guetta.

=== 2025–present: EPs and upcoming project ===
On 14 February 2025, Anne-Marie released a two-track extended play, If You're Looking For a New Best Friend. Another two-track extended play, If You're Looking for a Reason to Key Your Ex's Car, was released on 11 April 2025. In April 2025, Aitch released the single "Luv?" featuring Anne-Marie. On 19 September, Anne-Marie released the single "Depressed". On 14 November, Anne-Marie released the single, "Merry Xmas Everybody" a cover of the song by Slade. Speaking to The Sun's Bizarre column, Anne-Marie described her fourth album as different from her first three albums, stating that she was going to "do a little spice", which is set for a 2026 release. On 3 January 2026, Anne-Marie appeared on the seventh series of The Masked Singer as a guest panellist and performer under the alias "Goldfish".

== Personal life ==
In 2018, Anne-Marie revealed that she is attracted to both men and women, but that she does not identify with the label bisexual. She said, "I just feel like I'm attracted to who I like."

Anne-Marie has been a vegetarian since 2018, however she stated that she will "try to eat vegan [food] as much as possible". On the Off Menu podcast, she revealed that she suffers from emetophobia – a fear of vomiting – and that the vegetarian diet helps reduce her anxiety around food, as she fears getting sick from eating meat. In April 2025, Anne-Marie revealed that she was no longer following a vegetarian diet due to gestational diabetes and food cravings during pregnancy.

Anne-Marie has opened up about her struggle with anxiety. She said that therapy helped her "face her demons during lockdown". She also stated that she has ADHD, dyslexia and obsessive–compulsive disorder (OCD). In 2025, Anne-Marie revealed that she suffered from postpartum depression and anxiety following two closely spaced pregnancies.

In 2022, Anne-Marie started dating British rapper Slowthai. Their relationship, while mostly private, was confirmed by Slowthai in an interview with Rolling Stone in February 2023. In 2024, it was revealed that the couple had secretly married in July 2022 in Las Vegas. In February 2024, Anne-Marie gave birth to their daughter. In February 2025, Anne-Marie announced that the couple was expecting their second child together. In April 2025, (Note: In an interview with Capital FM on 16 April 2025, Anne-Marie, referring to childbirth, said that "it could happen today". In an interview with This Morning on 14 October 2025, she stated that her son was nearly 6 months old.) she gave birth to their son.

Anne-Marie lives in both East London and her hometown of East Tilbury in Essex.

Anne-Marie is a Manchester United supporter.

== Discography ==
Studio albums

- Speak Your Mind (2018)
- Therapy (2021)
- Unhealthy (2023)

== Filmography ==
Television, as herself
| Year | Name | Notes |
|---|---|---|
| 2018, 2020 | Celebrity Juice | Panellist |
| 2018 | The Last Leg | Series 13; Episode 5 |
| 2021–2023 | The Voice UK | Coach (seasons 10–12) |
| 2021 | The Great Celebrity Bake Off For Stand Up To Cancer | Series 4; Episode 2 |
| 2021 | The Jonathan Ross Show | Series 17; Episode 8 |
| 2021–2022 | Celebrity Gogglebox | Main role (seasons 3–4) |
| 2021 | Never Mind the Buzzcocks | Season 29; Episode 1 |
| 2021 | Strictly Come Dancing Christmas Special | Winner of the one-off competition |
| 2024 | Michael McIntyre's Big Show | Send To All Guest |
| 2026 | The Masked Singer | Guest panellist (series 7, episode 1) |
| 2026 | RuPaul's Drag Race UK | Guest judge (series 8, episode 6) |

Film roles
| Year | Name | Role | Notes |
|---|---|---|---|
| 2020 | How to Be Anne-Marie | Herself | Documentary |
| 2021 | Anne-Marie: Therapy – The Live Experience | Herself | Global livestream of the album, Therapy |
| 2022 | Turning Red | Lauren (voice) | Cameo; UK version |

== Bibliography ==
- Nicholson, Anne-Marie (2021). You Deserve Better. London: Orion Publishing Group, Limited. ISBN 9781398707412. OCLC 1263790073.

== Tours ==
Headlining

- Speak Your Mind World Tour (2018–19)
- Dysfunctional Tour (2022)
- The Unhealthy Club Tour (2023–24)

Supporting

- ÷ Tour (Europe and North America legs) (2017–18)

== Awards and nominations ==
| Year | Award | Recipient(s) | Category | Result | Ref. |
|---|---|---|---|---|---|
| 2016 | MTV Europe Music Award | Herself | Best Push Act | Nominated | |
| 2016 | MTV Brand New | Herself | MTV Brand New | Won | |
| 2016 | MOBO Awards | Herself | Best Newcomer | Nominated | |
| 2016 | A&R Awards | Herself | Breaking Artist | Nominated | |
| 2017 | Electronic Dance Music Awards | "Alarm" (Marshmello Remix) | Best Trap Remix | Nominated | |
| 2017 | Electronic Dance Music Awards | "Alarm" (Marshmello Remix) | Best Use of Vocal | Won | |
| 2017 | O2 Silver Clef Awards | Herself | Best Newcomer Award | Won | |
| 2017 | Brit Awards | Herself | Critics' Choice | Nominated | |
| 2017 | Brit Awards | Herself | British Breakthrough Act | Nominated | |
| 2017 | Brit Awards | "Rockabye" (with Clean Bandit) | British Single of the Year | Nominated | |
| 2017 | Brit Awards | "Rockabye" (with Clean Bandit) | British Video of the Year | Eliminated | |
| 2017 | Teen Choice Awards | "Rockabye" (with Clean Bandit) | Choice Music: Dance/Electronic Song | Nominated | |
| 2017 | LOS40 Music Awards | "Rockabye" (with Clean Bandit) | International Song of the Year | Nominated | |
| 2017 | Gaygalan | "Rockabye" (with Clean Bandit) | International Song of the Year | Nominated | |
| 2017 | MTV Europe Music Award | "Rockabye" (with Clean Bandit) | Best Song | Nominated | |
| 2017 | MTV Europe Music Award | Artists for Grenfell | Power of Music Award | Won | |
| 2017 | ARIA Music Awards | Catch 22 (Illy featuring Anne-Marie) | Song of the Year | Nominated | |
| 2018 | APRA Music Awards | Catch 22 (Illy featuring Anne-Marie) | Urban Work of the Year | Won | |
| 2018 | Billboard Music Award | "Rockabye" (with Clean Bandit) | Top Dance/Electronic Song | Nominated | |
| 2018 | iHeartRadio Music Awards | "Rockabye" (with Clean Bandit) | Dance Song of the Year | Nominated | |
| 2018 | Electronic Dance Music Awards | "Rockabye" (with Clean Bandit & Sean Paul) (Lodato & Joseph Duveen Remix) | Best Remix Collaboration | Nominated | |
| 2018 | WDM Radio Awards | "Rockabye" (with Clean Bandit) | Best Global Track | Won | |
| 2018 | WDM Radio Awards | Herself | Best Electronic Vocalist | Nominated | |
| 2018 | Teen Choice Awards | "Friends" (with Marshmello) | Choice Music: Dance/Electronic Song | Nominated | |
| 2018 | iHeartRadio Much Music Video Awards | "Friends" (with Marshmello) | Song of the Summer | Nominated | |
| 2018 | iHeartRadio Much Music Video Awards | "Friends" (with Marshmello) | Best Collaboration | Nominated | |
| 2018 | MTV Video Music Awards Japan | "Friends" (with Marshmello) | Best New: International | Won | |
| 2018 | MTV Video Music Awards Japan | "Friends" (with Marshmello) | Video of The Year | Won | |
| 2018 | Melon Music Awards | "Friends" (with Marshmello) | Best Pop Award | Nominated | |
| 2018 | LOS40 Music Awards | Herself | International New Artist of the Year | Nominated | |
| 2018 | MTV Europe Music Award | Herself | Best New Act | Nominated | |
| 2018 | MTV Europe Music Award | Herself | Best UK & Ireland Act | Nominated | |
| 2018 | Brit Awards | "Ciao Adios" | British Video of the Year | Eliminated | |
| 2019 | Brit Awards | Herself | British Female Solo Artist | Nominated | |
| 2019 | Brit Awards | "Speak Your Mind" | British Album of the Year | Nominated | |
| 2019 | Brit Awards | "2002" | British Single of the Year | Nominated | |
| 2019 | Brit Awards | "2002" | British Video of the Year | Nominated | |
| 2019 | Global Awards | "2002" | Best Song | Nominated | |
| 2019 | Global Awards | Herself | Best Female | Nominated | |
| 2019 | Global Awards | Herself | Best British Artist or Group | Nominated | |
| 2019 | Global Awards | Herself | Best Pop | Won | |
| 2019 | iHeartRadio Music Awards | "Rewrite the Stars" | Best Cover Song | Nominated | |
| 2019 | iHeartRadio Music Awards | "Friends" (with Marshmello) | Dance Song of the Year | Nominated | |
| 2019 | Electronic Dance Music Awards | "Friends" (with Marshmello) (Kokiri remix) | Remix of the Year – Production | Nominated | |
| 2019 | Electronic Dance Music Awards | "Friends" (with Marshmello) (M-22 remix) | Remix of the Year – Production | Nominated | |
| 2019 | Remarkable Women Awards 2019 | Herself | Artist of the Year | Won | |
| 2019 | 2019 V Live Awards V Heartbeat | Herself | Favourite Artist Worldwide | Won | |
| 2019 | BMI London Awards | "Friends" (with Marshmello) | Pop Award Songs | Won | |
| 2019 | Circle Chart Music Awards | "2002" | Overseas Song of the Year | Won | |
| 2020 | Melon Music Awards | "Birthday" | Best Pop Award | Nominated | |
| 2020 | Asia Artist Awards | Herself | Best Pop Artist | Won | |
| 2020 | Spotify Awards | Herself | Most-Streamed Female Artist on Consoles | Nominated | |
| 2021 | British LGBT Awards | Herself | Music Artist | Won | |
| 2022 | Brit Awards | "Don't Play" (with KSI & Digital Farm Animals) | Song of the Year | Nominated | |
| 2022 | Global Awards | Herself | Best British Act | Nominated | |
| 2022 | Global Awards | Herself | Best Female | Won | |
| 2022 | Glamour Women of the Year Awards 2022 | Herself | Musician of the Year | Won | |
| 2023 | Global Awards | Herself | Best British Act | Nominated | |
| 2023 | Global Awards | Herself | Best Female | Nominated | |
| 2023 | British Phonographic Industry | Herself | Brits Billion Award | Won | |
| 2023 | Nickelodeon Kids’ Choice Awards Abu Dhabi | Herself | Favourite International Artist | Nominated | |
| 2023 | 2023 People's Choice Country Awards | "Unhealthy" (featuring Shania Twain) | The Crossover Song Of 2023 | Nominated | |
| 2023 | A&R Awards | "Psycho" (with Aitch) | Song Of The Year | Nominated | |
| 2023 | MTV Europe Music Awards | "Baby Don't Hurt Me" (with David Guetta & Coi Leray) | Best Collaboration | Nominated | |
| 2023 | NRJ Music Awards | "Baby Don't Hurt Me" (with David Guetta & Coi Leray) | Best Recovery/Adaptation | Nominated | |
| 2023 | MAMA Awards | "Expectations" (with Minnie from (G)I-dle) | Best Collaboration | Nominated | |
| 2023 | MAMA Awards | "Expectations" (with Minnie from (G)I-dle) | Song of the Year | Nominated | |
| 2023 | Billboard Music Awards | "Baby Don't Hurt Me" (with David Guetta & Coi Leray) | Top Dance/Electronic Song | Nominated | |
| 2024 | Grammy Awards | "Baby Don't Hurt Me" (with David Guetta & Coi Leray) | Best Pop Dance Recording | Nominated | |
| 2024 | Electronic Dance Music Awards | "Baby Don't Hurt Me" (with David Guetta & Coi Leray) | Dance Radio Song Of The Year | Won | |
| 2024 | Electronic Dance Music Awards | "Baby Don't Hurt Me" (with David Guetta & Coi Leray) | Dance / Electro Pop Song of the Year | Nominated | |
| 2024 | Electronic Dance Music Awards | "Baby Don't Hurt Me" (with David Guetta & Coi Leray) | Best Use of Sample | Won | |
| 2024 | iHeartRadio Music Awards | "Baby Don't Hurt Me" (with David Guetta & Coi Leray) | Dance Song of the Year | Nominated | |
| 2024 | Kids' Choice Awards | "Baby Don't Hurt Me" (with David Guetta & Coi Leray) | Favourite Music Collaboration | Nominated | |
| 2024 | Global Awards | "Unhealthy"(featuring Shania Twain) | Best Song | Nominated | |
| 2024 | Global Awards | Herself | Best Female | Nominated | |
| 2024 | Global Awards | Herself | Best Pop | Nominated | |
| 2024 | Hollywood Music in Media Awards | "The Idea of You"(with Nicholas Galitzine) | Original Song – Feature Film | Nominated | |
| 2024 | Hollywood Music in Media Awards | "The Idea of You"(with Nicholas Galitzine) | Song – Onscreen Performance (Film) | Nominated | |
| 2025 | Guild of Music Supervisors Awards | "The Idea of You"(with Nicholas Galitzine) | Best Song Written and/or Recorded for Television | Nominated | |
