= Aitch (rapper) =

English rapper

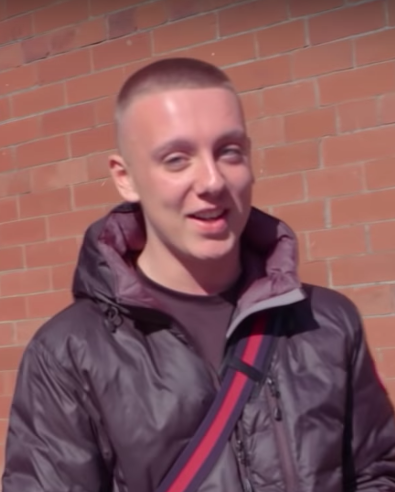
- Aitch in 2018

Background information
- Born: 9 December 1999 (age 26); New Moston, Manchester, England
- Genre: British hip-hop
- Occupations: Rapper; songwriter
- Years active: 2015–present
- Labels: Northern Quarterz; Since 93; Capitol
- Publisher: Sony Music Publishing
- Website: www.aitchofficial.com

Harrison James Armstrong (born 9 December 1999), known professionally as Aitch, is an English rapper from Manchester. He rose to fame in 2018 with the track "Straight Rhymez". His debut studio album Close to Home (2022) reached number two on the UK Albums Chart.

Aitch has released eleven top-10 singles in the UK, including "Taste (Make It Shake)" and "Baby", which both peaked at number two on the UK Singles Chart. The name Aitch derives from the pronunciation of the letter 'h', which is the first letter of his birth name.

Aitch is an ambassador for the charity Down's Syndrome Association to whom he gave a donation from the budget of his music video for his track "My G" as the song is about his sister, Gracie, who has the condition.

== Early life ==
Harrison James Armstrong was born on 9 December 1999 in New Moston, Manchester. He has Irish ancestry through his mother. He is a lifelong supporter of the football club Manchester United. After leaving school, he went to college and played sports, but eventually dropped out and worked in construction with his grandfather.

== Career ==
=== 2015: Beginnings ===
Aitch first garnered attention in 2015 when a YouTube video of him rapping to friends gained local popularity. He originally did not want the video published, but changed his mind when it gained 10,000 views. A friend continued uploading Aitch's freestyles to see if it would gain more views.

=== 2016–2018: Freestyles, On Your Marks and Breakthrough ===
Aitch made multiple appearances on the P110 YouTube channel, starting in September 2016 with a freestyle. In June 2017, he premiered his song "Back To Basics" on the channel. On 9 December 2017, he released his EP, On Your Marks. In May 2018, he released his breakthrough track "Straight Rhymez", earning him national attention.

=== 2019–present: AitcH2O, Polaris, Close to Home and other projects ===
In August 2019, he released his song "Taste (Make It Shake)" which became his biggest song at the time, peaking at number eight on the UK Singles Chart. He then released his second EP, AitcH2O, in September, which reached number three on the UK Albums Chart. In March 2020, he collaborated with AJ Tracey and Tay Keith on the track "Rain" which peaked at number three on the UK Singles Chart. In May, his third EP, Polaris was released. In June 2021, Aitch released the single "Learning Curve". He followed this up with "Party Round My Place" in September.

In October 2021, Aitch appeared on Never Mind the Buzzcocks.

On 3 February 2022, Aitch was featured on ArrDee's single "War". The single debuted at number 6 on the UK Official Singles Top 100 Chart and debuted at number 21 on the UK Official Singles Sales Chart Top 100 on 11 February 2022. On 10 March 2022, Aitch released the single "Baby" featuring American singer Ashanti (who is credited as co-lead on the single) which heavily samples the latter's 2003 hit "Rock wit U (Awww Baby)". Less than 24 hours later, the single debuted at number 65 on the UK Official Singles Sales Chart Top 100. It debuted on the UK Official Singles Top 100 on 18 March 2022 at number 2.

In August 2022, Aitch released "My G", featuring Ed Sheeran, which is about Aitch's sister Gracie who has Down syndrome. His debut studio album, Close to Home was released on 19 August 2022, and reached number two on the UK Albums Chart.

On 9 September 2023, he performed during the half time of the Sidemen Charity Match at the London Stadium. In November 2025, Aitch participated in the twenty-fifth series of I'm a Celebrity...Get Me Out of Here!, finishing the show in 4th place, despite being the bookmakers' favourite to win before the show.

On 20 February 2026, Aitch was featured on singer Calum Scott's single "Unsteady".

As part of their new line-up for the Voice UK, ITV announced on 11 September 2026 that Aitch would be making his debut as a coach on Series 15 alongside another debut coach Cheryl and returning judges Kelly Rowland and will.i.am.

== Discography ==
=== Studio albums ===
List of studio albums, with selected details
Title	Details	Peak chart positions					Certifications
Title	Details	UK	AUS	BEL (FL)	IRE	NLD	Certifications
Close to Home	Released: 19 August 2022; Label: EMI, Capitol, Infinitum; Format: CD, digital download, streaming, vinyl, cassette	2	52	169	24	46	BPI: Silver
4	Released: 20 June 2025; Label: Infinitum; Format: CD, digital download, streaming, vinyl, cassette	7	—	—	—	—	
"—" denotes a recording that did not chart or was not released in that territory.

=== Extended plays ===
List of extended plays, with selected details
Title	Details	Peak chart positions		Certifications
Title	Details	UK	IRE	Certifications
On Your Marks	Released: 9 December 2017; Label: NQ Records; Format: CD, digital download, streaming	—	—	
AitcH2O	Released: 6 September 2019; Label: Since 93; Format: CD, vinyl, digital download, streaming	3	18	BPI: Silver
Polaris	Released: 29 May 2020; Label: Infinitum Records; Format: CD, digital download, streaming	7	50	
Lost Files	Released: 17 November 2023; Label: Infinitum Records, NQ Records; Format: Digital download, streaming, USB	—	—	
"—" denotes a recording that did not chart or was not released in that territory.

=== Singles ===
==== As lead artist ====
List of singles as lead artist, with selected chart positions and certifications, showing year released and album name
Title	Year	Peak chart positions					Certifications	Album
Title	Year	UK	AUS	IRE	LBN	SCO	Certifications	Album
"Blitzed" (featuring Kay Rico)	2018	—	—	—	—	—		Non-album singles
"Vibsing"	2018	—	—	—	—	—		Non-album singles
"Daily Duppy" (featuring GRM Daily)	2018	—	—	—	—	—	BPI: Silver	Non-album singles
"Trust Me"	2018	—	—	—	—	—		Non-album singles
"Straight Rhymez"	2018	—	—	—	—	—	BPI: Silver	Non-album singles
"Miss Me with It"	2018	—	—	—	—	—		Non-album singles
"Wait"	2019	—	—	—	—	—		Non-album singles
"On the Way Home" (with Jaykae featuring Bowser Boss)	2019	73	—	—	—	—	BPI: Silver	Non-album singles
"Taste (Make It Shake)"	2019	2	—	12	—	8	BPI: 2× Platinum	AitcH2O
"Buss Down" (featuring ZieZie)	2019	8	—	55	—	74	BPI: Platinum	AitcH2O
"Mice"	2020	34	—	78	—	—		Non-album single
"Rain" (with AJ Tracey featuring Tay Keith)	2020	3	61	10	—	23	BPI: 2× Platinum; ARIA: Platinum	Polaris
"Raw"	2020	57	—	—	—	—		Polaris
"Goyard Batman" (with Lil Pump and The Plug)	2020	—	—	—	—	—		Non-album single
"Safe to Say"	2020	56	—	85	—	—	BPI: Silver	Polaris
"Learning Curve"	2021	27	—	74	—	—	BPI: Silver	Non-album singles
"GSD"	2021	52	—	—	—	—		Non-album singles
"Party Round My Place" (with Avelino)	2021	56	—	—	—	—		Non-album singles
"War" (with ArrDee)	2022	6	—	28	—	—	BPI: Silver	Pier Pressure
"Baby" (with Ashanti)	2022	2	—	5	—	—	BPI: Platinum; ARIA: Platinum	Close to Home
"Just Coz" (with Giggs)	2022	42	—	—	—	—		Non-album single
"1989"	2022	23	—	62	—	—		Close to Home
"In Disguise" (with Bakar)	2022	—	—	—	—	—		Close to Home
"My G" (with Ed Sheeran)	2022	6	—	32	—	—	BPI: Gold	Close to Home
"Psycho" (with Anne-Marie)	2022	5	—	8	19	—	BPI: Platinum	Unhealthy
"Round 2"	2023	—	—	—	—	—		Non-album singles
"Hide N Seek" (with Toddla T featuring Taet)	2023	—	—	—	—	—		Non-album singles
"Tip Toes" (with Clavish)	2023	52	—	—	—	—		Non-album singles
"Scary" (with A1 x J1)	2023	88	—	—	—	—		Non-album singles
"Landslide" (with Nafe Smallz)	2023	—	—	—	—	—		Lost Files
"Heist" (featuring PLK)	2023	—	—	—	—	—		Lost Files
"Famous Girl"	2024	78	—	—	—	—		Non-album singles
"Baddies" (with Luciano)	2024	—	—	—	—	—		Non-album singles
"Gold Mine" (with D-Block Europe)	2024	71	—	—	—	—		Non-album singles
"Maybach Wallet"	2024	—	—	—	—	—		Non-album singles
"FWG"	2024	—	—	—	—	—		Non-album singles
"Scary Movie" (with Avelino)	2024	—	—	—	—	—		Non-album singles
"Raving in the Studio" (with Bou)	2025	22	—	—	—	—	BPI: Silver	Non-album singles
"A Guy Called?"	2025	25	—	—	—	—		Non-album singles
"Straight Rhymez 2"	2025	—	—	—	—	—		4
"Bounce"	2025	—	—	—	—	—		4
"Luv?" (with Anne-Marie)	2025	—	—	—	—	—		4
"Till L4te" (featuring Pozer)	2025	—	—	—	—	—		4
"Col4 Body" (featuring Tiggs Da Author)	2025	—	—	—	—	—		4
"GTTB" (with Chip)	2026	—	—	—	—	—		TBA
"RMB (Ring My Bell)"	2026	40	—	60	—	—		TBA
"—" denotes a recording that did not chart or was not released in that territory.

==== As featured artist ====
List of singles as a featured artist, with selected chart positions and certifications, showing year released and album name
Title	Year	Peak chart positions						Certifications	Album
Title	Year	UK	AUT	GER	IRE	SCO	SWI	Certifications	Album
"Strike a Pose" (Young T & Bugsey featuring Aitch)	2019	9	—	—	11	31	—	BPI: 2× Platinum	Plead the 5th
"Kilos" (Bugzy Malone featuring Aitch)	2019	20	—	—	61	—	—	BPI: Silver	Non-album singles
"French Kisses" (ZieZie featuring Aitch)	2019	35	—	—	76	—	—	BPI: Silver	Non-album singles
"Kids to Adults" (Tasha featuring Aitch)	2020	—	—	—	—	—	—		Non-album singles
"12:12 AM / Patients (F*****g Up a Friday)" (Everything Is Recorded featuring Aitch and Infinite Coles)	2020	—	—	—	—	—	—		Friday Forever
"UFO" (D-Block Europe featuring Aitch)	2020	11	—	—	52	—	—	BPI: Platinum	The Blue Print: Us vs. Them
"House & Garage" (Morrisson featuring Aitch)	2021	46	—	—	—	—	—		Guilty
"Bad" (Pa Salieu featuring Aitch)	2021	82	—	—	—	—	—		Non-album single
"Bamba" (Luciano featuring Aitch & Bia)	2022	—	1	1	—	—	1	BVMI: Platinum; IFPI AUT: Platinum	Majestic
"Let's Go" (Tion Wayne featuring Aitch)	2022	30	—	—	84	—	—		Non-album singles
"Grey (Remix)" (Yung Filly featuring Aitch)	2024	—	—	—	—	—	—		Non-album singles
"Bridges" (Ezhel featuring Aitch)	2024	—	—	—	—	—	—		Derdo
"DND" (Potter Payper featuring Aitch)	2024	—	—	—	—	—	—		Nightmare Before Christmas
"Friday Prayer" (AJ Tracey featuring Headie One & Aitch)	2025	—	—	—	—	—	—		Don't Die Before You're Dead
"Unsteady" (Calum Scott featuring Aitch)	2026	—	—	—	—	—	—		Non-album single
"—" denotes a recording that did not chart or was not released in that territory.

=== Promotional singles ===
List of promotional singles, showing year released and album name
Title	Year	Album	Notes
"AitcH2O Freestyle"	2019	Non-album singles	Freestyle released coinciding with the announcement of the AitcH2O EP release date and AitcH20 Tour.
"101Barz Freestyle"	2020	Non-album singles	Recording of the freestyle performed for the 101Barz YouTube channel.
"Murdaside (Remix)" (with Mazza L20 and Potter Payper)	2024	Lost Files	

=== Other charted and certified songs ===
List of other charted songs, showing year released, certifications and album name
Title	Year	Peak chart positions		Certifications	Album
Title	Year	UK	IRE	Certifications	Album
"Already" (featuring Tyreezy)	2019	43	—		AitcH2O
"Pop Boy" (Stormzy featuring Aitch)	2019	—	—	BPI: Silver	Heavy Is the Head
"Ei8ht Mile" (DigDat featuring Aitch)	2020	9	34	BPI: Silver	Ei8ht Mile
"30"	2020	36	91		Polaris
"Parlez-vous anglais" (Headie One featuring Aitch)	2020	24	47		Edna
"—" denotes a recording that did not chart or was not released in that territory.

=== Other guest appearances ===
List of non-single guest appearances, showing year released, other artist(s), and album name
Title	Year	Other artist(s)	Album
"Know Better" (Remix)	2019	Kay Rico	Non-album remix
"Keisha & Becky" (Remix)	2019	Russ Millions, Tion Wayne, Jay1, Sav'o and Swarmz	T Wayne's World 3
"Take Me Back to London" (Sir Spyro Remix)	2019	Ed Sheeran, Stormzy, Jaykae	Non-album remix
"Ei8ht Mile"	2020	DigDat	Ei8ht Mile
"Moving Naughty"	2020	GRM Daily, B Young	GRM 10
"Parlez-Vous Anglais"	2020	Headie One	Edna
"Latest Trends" (Remix)	2021	A1 x J1	Non-album remix
"Operation Fortress"	2023	D-Block Europe	DBE World
"Who You Are"	2025	Krsna	Yours Truly

== Awards and nominations ==
Award nominations for Aitch
Year	Organisation	Award	Work	Result
2020	NME	Essential New Artists for 2020	Himself	Included
2020	Brit Awards	Best New Artist	Himself	Nominated
2022	Berlin Music Video Awards	Best Cinematography	LEARNING CURVE	Nominated
2023	Brit Awards	British Hip Hop/Grime/Rap Act	Himself	Won
2023	Brit Awards	Song of the Year	"Baby"	Nominated

=== Listicles ===
Publisher	Year	Listicle	Result	Ref.
Forbes	2022	30 Under 30: Entertainment (Europe)	Placed	
