= Close to Home (Aitch album) =

Studio album by Aitch
- Released: 19 August 2022
- Genre: Hip-hop
- Length: 47:57
- Label: Capitol
- Producer: Aod; Berwyn; Crooza; Fred; Gibbo; Benjy Gibson; LiTek; Jacob Manson; New Machine; P2J; Mark Ralph; Sangy; Fraser T. Smith; Whyjay

Aitch chronology
Polaris (2020)	Close to Home (2022)	Lost Files (2023)

Singles from Close to Home
- 1. "Baby" Released: 10 March 2022; 2. "1989" Released: 20 May 2022; 3. "In Disguise" Released: 20 June 2022; 4. "My G" Released: 19 August 2022

Close to Home is the debut full-length studio album by British rapper Aitch, released in 2022. The album features guest appearances from Mastermind, Ashanti, New Machine, Bakar, AJ Tracey and Ed Sheeran. The album received mixed to positive reviews from critics, with some criticising the uneven quality of the songs.

The album was the first record to include NFT content to enter the UK Albums Chart.

== Critical reception ==
Professional ratings
Aggregate scores
Source	Rating
AnyDecentMusic?	6.0/10
Metacritic	67/100
Review scores
Source	Rating
Clash	5/10
Crack	6/10
The Daily Telegraph	4/5 stars
Evening Standard	4/5 stars
Gigwise	8/10 stars
The Guardian	3/5 stars
The Line of Best Fit	7/10
NME	4/5 stars
The Observer	3/5 stars
Spectrum Culture	3/5 stars

According to the review aggregator Metacritic, Close to Home received "generally favorable reviews" based on a weighted average score of 67 out of 100 from six critic scores. In NME, Fred Garratt-Stanley gave Close to Home four out of five stars, noting how Aitch's public persona has matured with this album. Sister publications The Guardian and The Observer rated this album three out of five stars; in the former, critic Alexis Petridis situating the release in terms of contemporary British youth culture, but noting the unevenness of the production and in the latter, Ammar Kalia praised the development of Aitch as a musician. Writing for The Line of Best Fit, Wepea Buntugu scored Close to Home a seven out of 10 due to the variety of emotions and tones found on the music and noting the successful collaborations, but opining that "there are a number of extra levels to reach". In The Daily Telegraph, Will Pritchard gave Close to Home four out of five stars, noting that "when [Aitch] takes a big swing, he can hit big", but pointing out that the album also has "duds".

== Track listing ==
4 track listing
No.	Title	Writer(s)	Producer(s)	Length
1.	"Belgraveroad 1"	Harrison Armstrong; Vlad Slusarenko; Jacob Jones	LiTek; Whyjay	3:31
2.	"Louis Vuitton"	Armstrong; Slusarenko; Jones	LiTek; Whyjay	3:02
3.	"1989"	Armstrong; Ian Brown; John Squire; Mark Ralph; Jones	Mark Ralph; Whyjay	2:17
4.	"Money Habits" (with Mastermind)	Armstrong; Slusarenko; Herbie Laidley; Jones	LiTek; Whyjay	2:42
5.	"Baby" (with Ashanti)	Armstrong; Andre Parker; Ashanti Douglas; Berwyn du Bois; Frederick Gibson, Benjy Gibson, Irving Lorenzo; Andre Parker; Crooza	Fred Again; Berwyn; Benjy Gibson; Crooza	2:57
6.	"Bring It Back"	Armstrong; Slusarenko; Sangy; Jones	LiTek; Sangy; Whyjay	2:42
7.	"Sunshine" (featuring New Machine)	Armstrong; Adam Jordan; Jones	New Machine; Whyjay	2:57
8.	"Fuego"	Armstrong; O'Shea Jackson; Jacob Manson; Larry Troutman; Roger Troutman; Jones; André Young	Jacob Mason; Whyjay	2:36
9.	"Cheque"	Armstrong; Adam Daniel; Jack Gibson; Richard Isong	Gibbo; P2J	2:41
10.	"In Disguise" (with Bakar)	Armstrong; Abubakar Shariff-Farr; Slusarenko; Jones	LiTek; Whyjay	2:38
11.	"The Palm"	Armstrong; Slusarenko; Manson; Jones	Manson; LiTek; Whyjay	2:47
12.	"100×"	Armstrong; Alastair O’Donnell; Jones	Aod; Whyjay	3:32
13.	"R Kid" (with AJ Tracey)	Armstrong; Slusarenko; Ché Grant; Jones	LiTek; Whyjay	3:13
14.	"My G" (with Ed Sheeran)	Armstrong; Slusarenko; Ed Sheeran; Fraser T. Smith; Jones	Fraser T. Smith	3:18
15.	"Close to Home"	Armstrong; Slusarenko; Naomi Parchment; Jones; Olivia Williams	LiTek; Whyjay	4:23
16.	"Hollinwood to Hollywood"	Armstrong; Anthony Crawford; Montell Jordan; Jones	LiTek; Whyjay	2:41

=== Notes ===
- "Belgraveroad 1" is stylised as "BelgraveRoad_1".
- "1989" samples "Fools Gold", written by Ian Brown and John Squire, as performed by the Stone Roses.
- "Baby" samples "Rock wit U (Awww Baby)", written by Ashanti Douglas, Andre Parker and Irving Lorenzo, as performed by Ashanti.

== Personnel ==
- Aitch – rapping

Additional musicians

- Aminé – additional vocals on "Cheque"
- Ashanti – vocals on "Baby", via a sample of "Rock wit U (Awww Baby)"
- Bakar – vocals on "In Disguise"
- Mastermind – vocals on "Money Habits"
- The Music Confectionary Children's Choir – vocals on "Close to Home"
  - Layla Bailey, Nia Bleazard, Alexander Bradburn, Ellie Brown, Emory Charles, Ruby Caulfield, Heaven Harriott, Llewellyn Martin, Monty Oakeshott, Naomi Parchment (also choir arrangement), Johann Roberts, Lola Tatnell, Taina Vasquez, Daniel Webley, Aimee White, Maisie Wilkinson, Olivia Williams (also choir arrangement), Shiloh Williams
- New Machine – vocals and production on "Sunshine"
- Ed Sheeran – vocals on "My G"
- AJ Tracey – vocals on "R Kid"

Technical personnel

- AoD – production on "100×"
- Scott Barnett – engineering
- Berwyn – production on "Baby"
- Aidan Cochrane – design
- Crooza – production on "Baby"
- Fred – production on "Baby"
- Chris Gehringer – mastering on "My G" at Sterling Sound, New Jersey, United States
- Gibbo – production on "Cheque"
- Benjy Gibson – production on "Baby"
- Eli Heisler – mixing and mastering on "My G"
- Kelvin Jones – creative design, photography
- Rob Kinelski – mixing on "My G" at The Fortress of Amplitude
- LiTek – production on all tracks except "1989", "Sunshine", "Fuego", "Cheque", "100×", and "My G" (additional production on latter track only)
- Jacob Manson – production on "The Palm"
- Prash "Engine-Earz" Mistry – mixing and mastering on all tracks except on "Baby" and "My G" at Forwa3DStudios, London, England, United Kingdom
- P2J – production on "Cheque"
- Pantha – additional production on "1989"
- Mark Ralph – production on "1989"
- George Reid – additional production on "1989"
- Jay Reynolds – mixing on "Baby" at Long Island Studios, London, England, United Kingdom
- Sangy – production on "Bring It Back"
- Fraser T. Smith – production on "My G"
- WhyJay – production on all tracks except "Baby", "Cheque", and "My G" (additional production on latter track only); executive production

== Chart performance ==
Chart performance for Close to Home
Chart	Peak	Duration (weeks)
Australian Albums (ARIA)	52	1
Belgian Albums (Ultratop Flanders)	169	1
Dutch Albums (Album Top 100)	46	1
Irish Albums (OCC)	24	1
Scottish Albums (OCC)	4	1
Swiss Albums (Schweizer Hitparade)	73	1
UK Albums (OCC)	2	4
UK R&B Albums (OCC)	1	14

== Certifications ==
Region	Certification	Certified units/sales
United Kingdom (BPI)	Silver	60,000^{‡}
^{‡} Sales+streaming figures based on certification alone.

== See also ==
- Lists of 2022 albums
