= My G =

2022 single by Aitch and Ed Sheeran

Single by Aitch and Ed Sheeran

from the album Close to Home
- Released: 19 August 2022
- Length: 3:18
- Label: Capitol
- Songwriters: Harrison Armstrong; Ed Sheeran; Fraser Thorneycroft-Smith; LiTek; WhyJay
- Producers: Smith; LiTek; WhyJay

Aitch singles chronology
"In Disguise" (2022)	"My G" (2022)	"Psycho" (2022)

Ed Sheeran singles chronology
"Noche de Novela" (2022)	"My G" (2022)	"Groundwork" (2022)

Music video
- "My G" on YouTube

"My G" is a song by British rapper Aitch and English singer-songwriter Ed Sheeran. It was released through Capitol Records on 19 August 2022 as the fourth and final single from Aitch's debut studio album, Close to Home, along with the album. Aitch and Ed Sheeran wrote the song with producers Fraser T. Smith, LiTek, and WhyJay. The song is about and dedicated to one of Aitch's younger twin sisters, Gracie, who was diagnosed with Down syndrome. Aitch raps the two verses that are sandwiched in the middle of the chorus that Ed Sheeran sings three times.

== Background ==
In an interview with Apple Music, Aitch explained the idea of the song:

My dad came up with the idea for this song, years ago, and since then, it's always been in the back of my mind. It's about my sister. I have a sister called Gracie, but we all call her G, and this album is the perfect time to make this song. She loves a bit of Ed Sheeran, he's her favorite artist by far. I've even sent Ed some videos in the past of my sister singing his songs. I know he's the biggest artist in the world, but this is genuinely just a personal song. I wouldn't care if it got 10 streams.

== Music video ==
The official music video for "My G" was released on Aitch's YouTube channel on 19 August 2022, alongside the release of the song and its parent album. It shows childhood pictures of Aitch and Gracie, while Ed Sheeran does not appear in the video, but he is shown as an animated character playing guitar through a TV screen and a blank page on a book.

== Charts ==
Chart performance for "My G"
Chart (2022)	Peak position
Ireland (IRMA)	32
New Zealand Hot Singles (RMNZ)	15
UK Singles (OCC)	6

== Certifications ==
Certifications for "My G"
Region	Certification	Certified units/sales
United Kingdom (BPI)	Gold	400,000^{‡}
^{‡} Sales+streaming figures based on certification alone.
