= Psycho (Anne-Marie and Aitch song) =

Single by Anne-Marie and Aitch

from the album Unhealthy
- Released: 15 September 2022
- Genre: Pop
- Length: 2:42
- Label: Major Tom's; Asylum
- Songwriters: Anne-Marie Nicholson; Harrison Armstrong; Grace Barker; Henry Tucker; Samuel Brennan; Tom Hollings; Tom Mann
- Producers: Billen Ted; Mojam

Anne-Marie singles chronology
| "_World" (2022) | "Psycho" (2022) | "Sad Bitch" (2023) |

Aitch singles chronology
| "My G" (2022) | "Psycho" (2022) | "Bamba" (2022) |

Music video
- "Psycho" on YouTube

"Psycho" is a song by British singer Anne-Marie and British rapper Aitch. It was released on 15 September 2022 by Major Tom's and Asylum Records, as the lead single from Anne-Marie's third studio album Unhealthy (2023). The song was written by the two artists alongside Grace Barker, Henry Tucker, Samuel Brennan, Tom Hollings, and Tom Mann, with the production being handled by Billen Ted and Mojam.

"Psycho" was a commercial success, peaking at number five on the UK Singles Chart. The song remained on the chart for a total of 25 weeks. It became Anne-Marie's eighth and Aitch's ninth top ten single at the time.

== Background and release ==
On 3 June 2022, Anne-Marie shared a snippet of the song's chorus to her TikTok. The audio became a trending sound, which led to Anne-Marie posting another snippet on 29 July. Anne-Marie performed the song for the first time during the Sziget Festival 2022. On 1 September 2022, Anne-Marie announced that "Psycho" with Aitch would be released on 9 September 2022, however, its release was postponed to 15 September due to the death of Queen Elizabeth II. It got premiered on the same day on BBC Radio 1's Future Sounds with Clara Amfo.

Speaking about the song with Clara Amfo, Anne-Marie shared that "Psycho" was supposed to be a solo song, but after receiving a lot of comments on TikTok she decided to ask Aitch to make his own verse. "In the last writing camp, we did this song, and I just knew straight that this is the first one of the next bit of my life. And I just put it on TikTok. I didn't even ask anyone. But I did it and they (her label) were like, 'Oh, this is cool'. And then everyone started saying, 'Aitch, Aitch, Aitch, Aitch!'. So I messaged him and I was like, 'Seems as if people want you to do this song'. And he said, 'Yeah, let's do it.' And then that was it.”

Anne-Marie explained that the song "was inspired by personal experience." She further added, "I was once in a situation where the guy I was seeing was gaslighting me when I suspected he was cheating on me, which he was (total mug)! It wasn’t ok and I called him out. This one’s for everyone out there who’s been in the same situation."

== Composition ==
The track is about Anne-Marie finding out that her partner is cheating on her, not just with one person, but with many women. When she confronts him, he denies everything and accuses her of being a "psycho" for not trusting him. In an interview with Irish radio FM104, Anne-Marie explained: "It's inspired by being in relationships were you think you're the problem and they make you believe that you're the issue, and I think a lot of people go through that because blaming other people is easier than taking the blame I guess. A lot of people have done that to me and I just want to turn it around."

The song's chorus, "You met up with Veronica late last night / You had a bit of Elena on the side / Was chattin' up Anita all last week / And now you're doin' Nina, how'd you even meet her? / Hittin' on Bianca, are you dumb? / Got with Alexandra and her mum / You're tellin' every girl they drive you mad / Yet you're callin' me the psychopath", interpolates "Mambo No. 5 (A Little Bit of...)" by Lou Bega.

== Promotion ==
The song was premiered on BBC Radio 1's Future Sounds with Clara Amfo on 15 September 2022.

The first duet performance of the song was during Anne-Marie's set at BBC Radio 1's Live Lounge on 10 November 2022.

== Music video ==
The music video for the song, directed by Samuel Douek, was released on 16 September 2022. It was filmed in London and features Anne-Marie finding out Aitch is cheating on her with seven different women that were referenced in the chorus.

== Remixes ==
"Psycho" received two official remixes from Majestic and The Wild.

== Charts ==
Chart performance for "Psycho"
| Chart (2022) | Peak position |
|---|---|
| Ireland (IRMA) | 8 |
| Sweden Heatseeker (Sverigetopplistan) | 1 |
| UK Singles (OCC) | 5 |

== Certifications ==
Certifications for "Psycho"
| Region | Certification | Certified units/sales |
|---|---|---|
| New Zealand (RMNZ) | Gold | 15,000^{‡} |
| United Kingdom (BPI) | Platinum | 600,000^{‡} |
^{‡} Sales+streaming figures based on certification alone.
