= Sad Bitch =

Single by Anne-Marie

from the album Unhealthy
- Released: 3 February 2023
- Genre: Pop
- Length: 2:13
- Label: Asylum; Major Tom's
- Songwriters: Anne-Marie Nicholson; Evan Blair; Taylor Cameron Upsahl; Samuel Brennan; Tom Hollings; Nami
- Producers: Evan Blair; Billen Ted

Anne-Marie singles chronology
| "Psycho" (2022) | "Sad Bitch" (2023) | "Expectations" (2023) |

Music video
- "Sad Bitch" on YouTube

"Sad Bitch" (stylised in all caps and replacing "i" with an "!") is a song by British singer Anne-Marie. It was released on 3 February 2023 by Major Tom's and Asylum Records as the second single from Anne-Marie's third studio album Unhealthy (2023). The song was written by Anne-Marie alongside Evan Blair, Taylor Cameron Upsahl, Samuel Brennan, Tom Hollings and Nami, with the production being handled by Evan Blair and Billen Ted.

== Composition ==
The song reflects a period in life where Anne-Marie took a step back and reassessed her self-worth. Talking about the meaning of the song, Anne-Marie said: "The song is about not being sad anymore. Whether you've had a break-up, lost someone, you're feeling down or just hate your boss. It's time for happiness. It's time for a change of plan. Time to put yourself first. Time to turn the page. Leave it behind and start again. A new chapter, a new storyline. A new you."

== Music video ==
The music video for the song was released on 3 February 2023. It was filmed at Adventure Island in Southend-on-Sea in Essex.

== Charts ==
Chart performance for "Sad Bitch"
| Chart (2023) | Peak position |
|---|---|
| UK Singles (Official Charts) | 65 |
| CIS Airplay (TopHit) | 155 |
