= Birthday (Anne-Marie song) =

2020 single by Anne-Marie

Single by Anne-Marie
- Released: 7 February 2020
- Recorded: 2019
- Genre: Pop
- Length: 3:01
- Label: Asylum
- Songwriters: Anne-Marie Nicholson; Delacey; Keith Sorrells; Warren Felder
- Producer: Oak

Anne-Marie singles chronology
"Fuck, I'm Lonely" (2019)	"Birthday" (2020)	"Her" (2020)

Music video
- "Birthday" on YouTube

"Birthday" is a song by English singer Anne-Marie. She co-wrote the song with Delacey, Keith Sorrells and Warren Felder. It was released as a single on 7 February 2020.

== Background ==
In an interview when she was on Sunday Brunch, she said the song reflects the happiness she is feeling at the moment, "Do you know what, I've written a lot of songs about being angry at my exes, which I think I'm quite known for so when I went into this new album I was like 'Do you know what, I'm happy at the moment, this song kind of shows that I think".

She also explained, that around October 2019, she heard many Christmas songs and noticed, that there are only a few versions of Birthday songs, so she decided to make her own.

== Music video ==
The official music video was filmed in Los Angeles and uploaded to YouTube on 7 February 2020. The video was directed by Hannah Lux Davis with creative direction from Kate Moross. The video shows Anne-Marie celebrating her birthday like a princess, complete with a ball gown and dancing in an opulent room. At midnight she's back home and hanging out with her friends.

== Live performances ==
Anne-Marie performed the song for the first time on The Greatest Dancer on 8 February 2020. Other major performances include her performance on Sunday Brunch, Saturday Night Takeaway and Celebrity Juice.

== Track listing ==
Digital download and stream
No.	Title	Length
1.	"Birthday"	3:01

Digital download and stream – acoustic version
No.	Title	Length
1.	"Birthday" (Acoustic)	2:59

Digital download – Don Diablo remix
No.	Title	Length
1.	"Birthday" (Don Diablo Remix)	3:45

Digital download and stream – James Hype remix
No.	Title	Length
1.	"Birthday" (James Hype Remix)	2:56

== Charts ==
Chart (2020)	Peak position
Australia (ARIA)	77
Belgium (Ultratop 50 Flanders)	47
Belgium (Ultratop 50 Wallonia)	34
Czech Republic Airplay (ČNS IFPI)	56
Ireland (IRMA)	40
Lithuania (AGATA)	60
Mexico Ingles Airplay (Billboard)	7
Netherlands (Dutch Tipparade)	3
Netherlands (Single Tip)	19
New Zealand Hot Singles (RMNZ)	8
Scotland Singles (Official Charts)	19
Slovakia Singles Digital (ČNS IFPI)	97
South Korea (Gaon)	38
Sweden Heatseeker (Sverigetopplistan)	1
UK Singles (Official Charts)	31

== Certifications ==
Region	Certification	Certified units/sales
United Kingdom (BPI)	Gold	400,000^{‡}
^{‡} Sales+streaming figures based on certification alone.

== Release history ==
Region	Date	Format	Label	Ref.
United Kingdom	7 February 2020	Digital download	Asylum	
