= Unhealthy (song) =

Single by Anne-Marie featuring Shania Twain

from the album Unhealthy
- Released: 18 May 2023
- Recorded: 2023
- Studio: London, England
- Genre: Country pop
- Length: 2:29
- Label: Major Tom's; Asylum
- Songwriters: Anne-Marie Nicholson; Connor McDonough; Riley McDonough; Castle
- Producers: Connor McDonough; Riley McDonough

Anne-Marie singles chronology
"Baby Don't Hurt Me" (2023)	"Unhealthy" (2023)	"Trainwreck" (2023)

Shania Twain singles chronology
"Giddy Up!" (2023)	"Unhealthy" (2023)	"White Claw" (2024)

Music video
- "Unhealthy" on YouTube

"Unhealthy" is a song by British singer Anne-Marie featuring Canadian singer Shania Twain. It was released on 18 May 2023 by Major Tom's and Asylum Records as the fourth single from Anne-Marie's third studio album of the same name (2023). The song was written by Anne-Marie alongside Connor McDonough, Riley McDonough and Castle, with the production being handled by Connor and Riley McDonough.

The song peaked at number 18 on the UK Singles Chart becoming Anne-Marie's thirteenth and Twain's twelfth top 20, respectively. Additionally, the song became Twain's first top-20 in the region since "Party for Two" in December 2004. The song was nominated at the 2024 Global Awards for Best Song.

== Background ==
Unhealthy is the title song from Anne-Marie's third studio album. The snippet of the song was shared alongside the album announcement on the artist's social media account on 27 April 2023. In an interview with Hits Radio, talking about the inspiration for the song, Anne-Marie said: "For some reason, sometimes I get something stuck in my head and I can't get it out, and with this one, I went into the studio and all I could see was a picture of myself just eating a burger, and all the juice just dripping down my chin. And like all the unhealthy stuff you can possibly imagine, pasta, pizza, everything! All the best things and just the title 'Unhealthy'." As a fan of Shania Twain, Anne-Marie reached out to her via DM, proposing a collaboration. By March, the two artists recorded the song in London.

== Composition ==
Unhealthy is a country-pop song. The song is about a toxic relationship. Anne-Marie acknowledges that the relationship is unhealthy, comparing the feelings to the negative effects of cigarettes and hangovers. The song also highlights the conflict between her family and friends, who are concerned about her well-being and urge her to leave the relationship. Despite their warnings, she remains loyal to her partner and is willing to take the risks and consequences of staying with him. The song is in the key of B minor with a tempo of 120 beats per minute and a time signature of 4/4. The chord progression Bm–D–A–E is used in the verses, choruses and post-choruses; the progression G-A-F♯/A♯–B, in the pre-choruses.

== Promotion ==
The song was premiered on BBC Radio 1's Future Sounds with Clara Amfo on 18 May 2023. The first live performance of the song was at the BBC The One Show on 19 May 2023.

== Music video ==
The music video for the song, directed by Olivia Rose, was released in June 2023. It was filmed in Nashville and in Kent. In a podcast Table Manners with Jessie Ware and Lennie Ware, Anne-Marie talked about the music video: "We went to Nashville the other day to do the music video, but she did her bit in Nashville and I did my bit in Kent. We filmed it like an old western movie. (...) I still went there to film some bits with her, but because weirdly Nashville don't have any western sets, they just have fields, so I was like 'I can't do the whole western video in a field dressed like a cowgirl', it just didn't make sense to me, so we found this set in Kent which is a whole town."

== Charts ==
=== Weekly charts ===
Weekly chart performance for "Unhealthy"
Chart (2023–2024)	Peak position
Belarus Airplay (TopHit)	184
Belgium (Ultratop 50 Flanders)	4
CIS Airplay (TopHit)	76
Croatia International Airplay (HRT)	9
Czech Republic Airplay (ČNS IFPI)	45
Estonia Airplay (TopHit)	64
Iceland (Tónlistinn)	12
Ireland (IRMA)	10
Latvia Airplay (LAIPA)	7
Lithuania Airplay (TopHit)	48
Netherlands (Dutch Top 40)	2
Netherlands (Single Top 100)	17
New Zealand Hot Singles (RMNZ)	10
Poland (Polish Airplay Top 100)	9
Romania Airplay (TopHit)	39
Slovakia Airplay (ČNS IFPI)	1
Turkey International Airplay (Radiomonitor Türkiye)	9
UK Singles (Official Charts)	18

=== Monthly charts ===
Monthly chart performance for "Unhealthy"
Chart (2023–2024)	Peak position
CIS Airplay (TopHit)	85
Czech Republic (Rádio – Top 100)	64
Lithuania Airplay (TopHit)	60
Romania Airplay (TopHit)	43
Slovakia (Rádio – Top 100)	1

=== Year-end charts ===
2023 year-end chart performance for "Unhealthy"
Chart (2023)	Position
Belgium (Ultratop 50 Flanders)	22
Iceland (Tónlistinn)	68
Lithuania Airplay (TopHit)	92
Netherlands (Dutch Top 40)	9
Netherlands (Single Top 100)	85
Romania Airplay (TopHit)	138

2024 year-end chart performance for "Unhealthy"
Chart (2024)	Position
Belgium (Ultratop 50 Flanders)	50
Iceland (Tónlistinn)	73
Netherlands (Dutch Top 40)	95

== Certifications ==
Certifications for "Unhealthy"
Region	Certification	Certified units/sales
Belgium (BRMA)	Gold	20,000^{‡}
Denmark (IFPI Danmark)	Gold	45,000^{‡}
Netherlands (NVPI)	Gold	40,000^{‡}
Poland (ZPAV)	Gold	25,000^{‡}
United Kingdom (BPI)	Platinum	600,000^{‡}
^{‡} Sales+streaming figures based on certification alone.
