= Baby Don't Hurt Me =

Single by David Guetta, Anne-Marie and Coi Leray
- Released: 6 April 2023
- Recorded: 2021–2022
- Genre: Dance-pop
- Length: 2:20; 3:18 (extended mix)
- Label: What a DJ; Warner UK
- Songwriters: Akil King; Anne-Marie Rose Nicholson; Coi Leray Collins; David Guetta; Dee Dee Halligan; Ed Sheeran; Feli Ferraro; Johnny McDaid; Junior Torello; Mikkel Cox; Steve Mac; Tobias Frederiksen
- Producers: David Guetta; Johnny Goldstein; Mike Hawkins; Toby Green

David Guetta singles chronology
"Here We Go Again" (2023)	"Baby Don't Hurt Me" (2023)	"Live Without Love" (2023)

Anne-Marie singles chronology
"Expectations" (2023)	"Baby Don't Hurt Me" (2023)	"Unhealthy" (2023)

Coi Leray singles chronology
"Nonsense" (remix) (2023)	"Baby Don't Hurt Me" (2023)	"Flip a Switch" (remix) (2023)

Music video
- "Baby Don't Hurt Me" on YouTube

"Baby Don't Hurt Me" is a collaborative single by French DJ David Guetta with British singer Anne-Marie and American rapper Coi Leray. It was released on 6 April 2023 through What a DJ and Warner UK. The song prominently interpolates Haddaway’s 1993 hit "What Is Love". It is included on the "Super Unhealthy" edition of Anne-Marie's third studio album Unhealthy.

The single was nominated for the Grammy Award for Best Pop Dance Recording at the 66th Annual Grammy Awards, the first nominations for Leray and Anne-Marie.

== Background and composition ==
The song was co-written by Ed Sheeran, who talked about the collaboration in an interview in March 2023. Guetta and Leray previewed the song at the 2023 Ultra Music Festival on 27 March 2023. The song was described as a "modern" reimagination of the 1993 song, with Guetta having found a formula "that works for him when it comes to scoring new hits" and sticking with it. For the song, Guetta utilised the "iconic" riff, melodies and a few lyrics from the original, putting a modern spin to it. The song release was accompanied by a lyric video.

== Music video ==
A music video, directed by Hannah Lux Davis, was filmed in late March 2023 and was released on 5 May 2023. The video pays homage to the 1998 A Night at the Roxbury - which prominently featured "What is Love" - with characters doing the head bobbing of the film's protagonists, the Butabi brothers, near the end.

== Remixes ==
The song has received remixes by Hypaton & Giuseppe Ottaviani, DJs From Mars, Borai & Denham, Joel Corry, Cedric Gervais, Robin Schulz, Sofi Tukker, and Ozone & Diagnostix.

== Accolades ==
Award nominations for "Baby Don't Hurt Me"
Year	Ceremony	Award	Result	Ref.
2023	Billboard Music Awards	Top Dance/Electronic Song	Nominated	
2023	Electronic Dance Music Awards	Dance Radio Song Of The Year	Won	
2023	Electronic Dance Music Awards	Best Use of Sample	Won	
2023	MTV Europe Music Awards	Best Collaboration	Nominated	
2023	NRJ Music Awards	Reprise or Adaptation Song of the Year	Nominated	
2024	Grammy Awards	Best Pop Dance Recording	Nominated	
2024	iHeartRadio Music Awards	Dance Song of the Year	Nominated	

== Charts ==
=== Weekly charts ===
Weekly chart performance for "Baby Don't Hurt Me"
Chart (2023–2024)	Peak position
Australia (ARIA)	67
Australia Dance (ARIA)	7
Austria (Ö3 Austria Top 40)	13
Belarus Airplay (TopHit)	4
Belgium (Ultratop 50 Flanders)	10
Belgium (Ultratop 50 Wallonia)	4
Canada Hot 100 (Billboard)	15
Canada CHR/Top 40 (Billboard)	25
CIS Airplay (TopHit)	1
Croatia International Airplay (Top lista)	4
Czech Republic Airplay (ČNS IFPI)	4
Czech Republic Singles Digital (ČNS IFPI)	27
Estonia Airplay (TopHit)	3
Finland (Suomen virallinen lista)	28
France (SNEP)	20
Germany (GfK)	9
Global 200 (Billboard)	41
Greece International Streaming (IFPI)	28
Hungary (Dance Top 40)	12
Hungary (Rádiós Top 40)	1
Hungary (Single Top 40)	2
Iceland (Tónlistinn)	11
Ireland (IRMA)	10
Italy (FIMI)	26
Kazakhstan Airplay (TopHit)	5
Latvia Airplay (LaIPA)	3
Lebanon Airplay (Lebanese Top 20)	3
Lithuania (AGATA)	38
Lithuania Airplay (TopHit)	4
Luxembourg (Billboard)	6
Moldova Airplay (TopHit)	1
Netherlands (Dutch Top 40)	5
Netherlands (Single Top 100)	8
Nigeria (TurnTable Top 100)	57
Norway (VG-lista)	14
Poland (Polish Airplay Top 100)	18
Poland (Polish Streaming Top 100)	35
Portugal (AFP)	54
Romania (UPFR)	7
Romania Airplay (Media Forest)	1
Romania TV Airplay (Media Forest)	10
Russia Airplay (TopHit)	2
San Marino (SMRRTV Top 50)	7
Slovakia Airplay (ČNS IFPI)	1
Slovakia Singles Digital (ČNS IFPI)	31
Spain (Promusicae)	89
Sweden (Sverigetopplistan)	36
Switzerland (Schweizer Hitparade)	6
Turkey International Airplay (Radiomonitor Türkiye)	1
Ukraine Airplay (TopHit)	2
UK Singles (Official Charts)	13
UK Dance (Official Charts)	4
US Billboard Hot 100	48
US Adult Contemporary (Billboard)	15
US Adult Pop Airplay (Billboard)	8
US Hot Dance/Electronic Songs (Billboard)	2
US Pop Airplay (Billboard)	12
Venezuela (Record Report)	41

=== Monthly charts ===
Monthly chart performance for "Baby Don't Hurt Me"
Chart (2023)	Peak position
Belarus Airplay (TopHit)	6
CIS Airplay (TopHit)	1
Czech Republic (Rádio – Top 100)	6
Czech Republic (Singles Digitál – Top 100)	27
Estonia Airplay (TopHit)	5
Kazakhstan Airplay (TopHit)	7
Latvia Airplay (TopHit)	56
Lithuania Airplay (TopHit)	13
Moldova Airplay (TopHit)	4
Paraguay (SGP)	82
Romania Airplay (TopHit)	10
Russia Airplay (TopHit)	5
Slovakia (Rádio – Top 100)	3
Slovakia (Singles Digitál – Top 100)	32
Ukraine Airplay (TopHit)	3

=== Year-end charts ===
2023 year-end chart performance for "Baby Don't Hurt Me"
Chart (2023)	Position
Austria (Ö3 Austria Top 40)	27
Belarus Airplay (TopHit)	39
Belgium (Ultratop 50 Flanders)	42
Belgium (Ultratop 50 Wallonia)	22
Canada (Canadian Hot 100)	47
CIS Airplay (TopHit)	10
Estonia Airplay (TopHit)	9
Germany (GfK)	28
Global 200 (Billboard)	125
Hungary (Dance Top 40)	46
Hungary (Rádiós Top 40)	7
Iceland (Tónlistinn)	65
Italy (FIMI)	59
Kazakhstan Airplay (TopHit)	24
Latvia Airplay (TopHit)	198
Lithuania Airplay (TopHit)	17
Moldova Airplay (TopHit)	20
Netherlands (Dutch Top 40)	30
Netherlands (Single Top 100)	31
Poland (Polish Airplay Top 100)	94
Romania Airplay (TopHit)	23
Russia Airplay (TopHit)	26
Sweden (Sverigetopplistan)	88
Switzerland (Schweizer Hitparade)	21
UK Singles (OCC)	93
Ukraine Airplay (TopHit)	26
US Adult Contemporary (Billboard)	42
US Adult Top 40 (Billboard)	37
US Hot Dance/Electronic Songs (Billboard)	4
US Mainstream Top 40 (Billboard)	40

2024 year-end chart performance for "Baby Don't Hurt Me"
Chart (2024)	Position
Australia Dance (ARIA)	48
Belarus Airplay (TopHit)	72
CIS Airplay (TopHit)	71
Estonia Airplay (TopHit)	89
Germany (GfK)	82
Hungary (Dance Top 40)	62
Hungary (Rádiós Top 40)	27
Iceland (Tónlistinn)	98
Kazakhstan Airplay (TopHit)	95
Lithuania Airplay (TopHit)	43
Russia Airplay (TopHit)	197
Switzerland (Schweizer Hitparade)	98
US Hot Dance/Electronic Songs (Billboard)	83

2025 year-end chart performance for "Baby Don't Hurt Me"
Chart (2025)	Position
Belarus Airplay (TopHit)	68
Hungary (Dance Top 40)	85
Lithuania Airplay (TopHit)	130

== Certifications ==
Certifications for "Baby Don't Hurt Me"
Region	Certification	Certified units/sales
Australia (ARIA)	Platinum	70,000^{‡}
Austria (IFPI Austria)	Platinum	30,000^{‡}
Canada (Music Canada)	2× Platinum	160,000^{‡}
Denmark (IFPI Danmark)	Platinum	90,000^{‡}
France (SNEP)	Diamond	333,333^{‡}
Germany (BVMI)	Platinum	600,000^{‡}
Italy (FIMI)	2× Platinum	200,000^{‡}
New Zealand (RMNZ)	Platinum	30,000^{‡}
Poland (ZPAV)	Platinum	50,000^{‡}
Portugal (AFP)	Platinum	10,000^{‡}
Spain (Promusicae)	Platinum	60,000^{‡}
Switzerland (IFPI Switzerland)	3× Platinum	60,000^{‡}
United Kingdom (BPI)	Platinum	600,000^{‡}
Streaming
Greece (IFPI Greece)	Gold	1,000,000^{†}
^{‡} Sales+streaming figures based on certification alone.^{†} Streaming-only figures based on certification alone.

== See also ==
- List of Billboard number-one dance songs of 2023
