= Mosquito Bowl (disambiguation) =

The Mosquito Bowl was a 1944 football game.

Mosquito Bowl may also refer to:

- The Mosquito Bowl (novel), a book about the game
- The Mosquito Bowl, a film based on the book
