= Mosquito Bowl =

Military-related football game in 1944

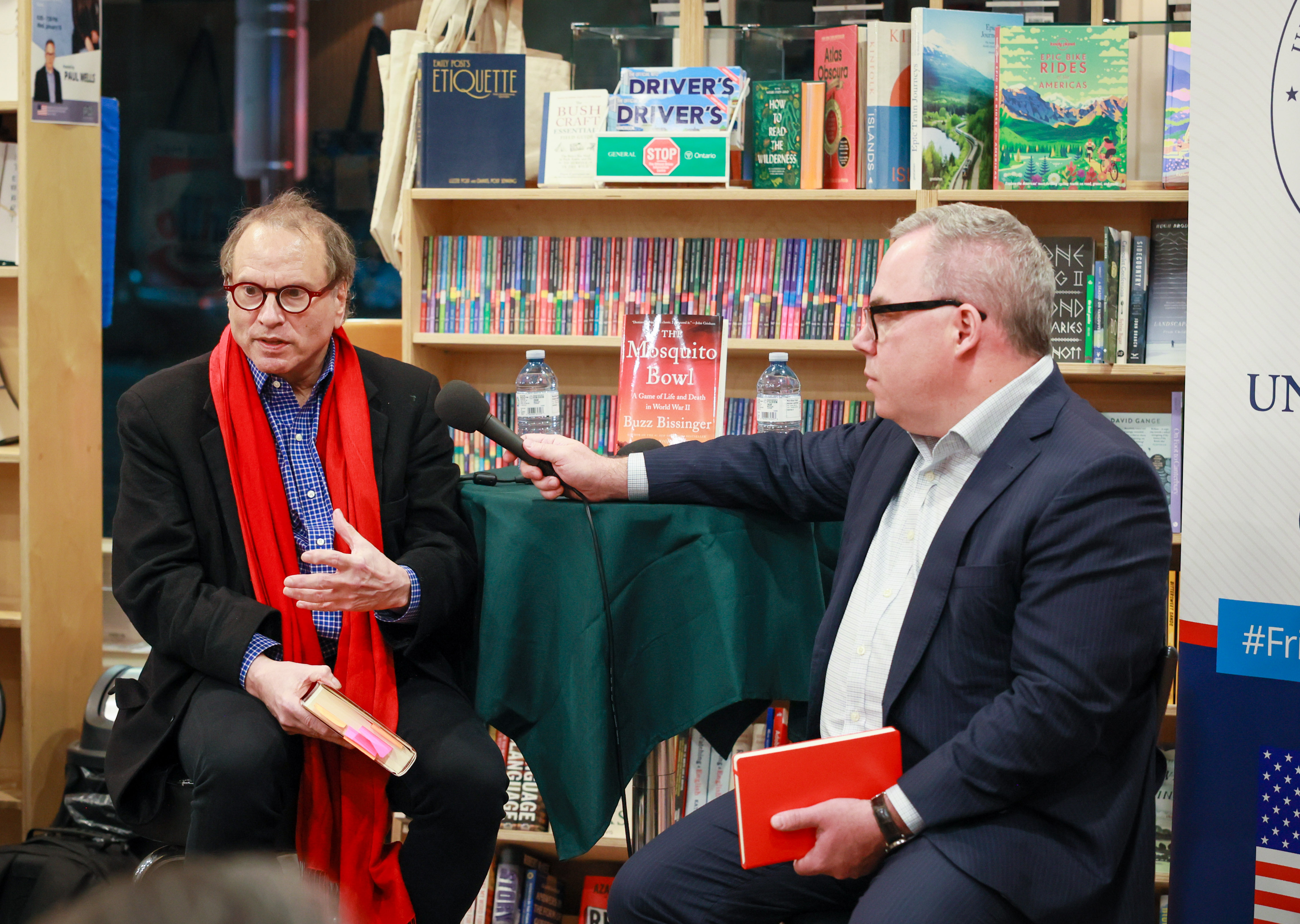
Buzz Bissinger (left) speaks about his book on the game in 2023.

The Mosquito Bowl was a football game played December 24, 1944, between two regiments of Marines at Guadalcanal during World War II. In 2022, Buzz Bissinger wrote an account, The Mosquito Bowl, which was widely reviewed.

== Background ==
Members of the 6th Marine Division, many of whom had played college football, were training on Guadalcanal during the final months of 1944. Many had been named to all-conference or All-America teams. Both the division's 4th and 29th Marine Regiments could field teams of such prominent players, and a game was organized for Christmas Eve with sixty-five players, including John McLaughry and Tony Butkovich.

The game ended in a scoreless tie.

Terry Frei's Third Down and a War to Go and his newspaper work earlier included extensive material on the Mosquito Bowl, relying on many interviews with then-surviving Marines who played in the game or served with those who did. In his book's backmatter, Bissinger thanked Frei for allowing him access to research and contacts. Frei's book featured his father's 1942 Wisconsin Badgers, including two of Jerry Frei's teammates, Dave Schreiner and Bob Baumann, who played in the Mosquito Bowl and were killed on Okinawa.

== In popular culture ==
In 2025, Netflix announced a film was in development directed by Peter Berg and starring Brent Comer, Nicholas Galitzine, Bill Skarsgård, Ray Nicholson and Tom Francis. The Mosquito Bowl was released by Netflix in October 2026.
