= Nicholas Galitzine =

English actor (born 1994)

- Galitzine in 2026
- Born: 29 September 1994 (age 32); Hammersmith, London, England
- Occupation: Actor
- Years active: 2014–present

Nicholas Dimitri Constantine Galitzine (/ˈɡælɪtsiːn/ GAL-it-seen; born 29 September 1994) is an English actor. After his acting debut in The Beat Beneath My Feet (2014), he appeared in an episode of the television series Legends, and had leading roles in the 2016 teen drama films High Strung and Handsome Devil. He later starred in the supernatural horror film The Craft: Legacy (2020) and the musical film Cinderella (2021), also contributing to the latter's accompanying soundtrack.

Galitzine's breakout role was the romantic drama Purple Hearts (2022). He achieved further prominence for romantic dramas Red, White & Royal Blue (2023) and The Idea of You (2024), the comedy film Bottoms (2023), and as Prince Adam / He-Man in the film Masters of the Universe (2026). In addition to acting, Galitzine has been a global menswear ambassador for fashion house Fendi since 2023, and global fragrance ambassador for Emporio Armani since 2024.

== Early life ==
Nicholas Dimitri Constantine Galitzine was born on 29 September 1994 in Hammersmith, West London. He lived near actor Robert Pattinson, whom he considered his "career idol". His father, Geoffrey Leo Alexander Galitzine, is a co-founder of a glass recycling company and a former financier in the City of London. Despite speculation that Galitzine is a member of the Golitsyn family, a Russian noble house, they are unrelated. Galitzine's grandfather, Edward Ralph Alexander Tier, changed his surname to Galitzine on 9 April 1956; Nicholas' traceable paternal ancestors are British. His mother is Lora Maria Konstantina Papayanni, a Greek-American. He has an older sister, Lexi. Growing up, Galitzine visited his relatives in the Peloponnese, Athens, and the islands during the holidays, which helped him connect with his Greek heritage.

Galitzine described himself as being reckless in his youth, being a smoker at 13. He attended Dulwich College, and played rugby, track, and football. He played for the Harlequins Academy and aspired to play rugby professionally until a series of injuries including an injury to his rotator cuff led his interest to wane, and consequently, he stopped playing. Galitzine was a part of Pleasance Islington, a youth theatre company. Galitzine first became interested in acting after his friends persuaded him to audition for a new adaptation of the 1891 play, Spring Awakening. He decided he wanted to focus on acting professionally in lieu of pursuing a university education, about which he recalled he had feelings of uncertainty. His parents were "terrified" of the decision due to the uncertain path. Galitzine supported himself financially by working part-time jobs, including at a frozen yogurt shop alongside Simone Ashley, who later also pursued acting professionally.

== Career ==
=== Beginnings (2014–2019) ===
Galitzine made his professional acting debut in the film The Beat Beneath My Feet (2014), starring alongside Luke Perry. He played a lonely teenage boy with musical aspirations who blackmails his neighbour, a former rock star, to mentor him. His casting was criticised by The Guardian for the belief that he was too conventionally attractive to play an outcast. In 2015, he appeared in a guest role in the episode "The Legend of Terrence Graves" of the TV series Legends. He played a blackmailer of an MI6 agent following their homosexual relations. He was named a "Star of Tomorrow" by Screen International the same year. He starred in the American drama High Strung (2016), in which he played a young violinist who performs in a subway station.

He played Conor Masters, a young closeted gay student, in the Irish comedy-drama Handsome Devil, which was later nominated for five awards at the 15th Irish Film & Television Awards. Empire commented that Galitzine "does good work" at portraying Conor's inner conflict. In 2017, he took part in the New Zealand mystery drama The Changeover and the American television film The Watcher in the Woods. Galitzine was cast in his first major TV role in the Netflix horror drama series Chambers. In 2019, he featured in the drama film Share.

=== Breakthrough and recognition (2020–present) ===
In 2020, Galitzine played the bisexual teenager Timmy in The Craft: Legacy, a sequel to The Craft (1996). In 2021, he starred as Prince Robert opposite Camila Cabello in the musical film Cinderella, appearing on seven songs on the soundtrack of the film. His debut single "Comfort" was released in June 2022. Galitzine starred in the Netflix film Purple Hearts, which was released on 29 July 2022. It was Galitzine's breakthrough role. He played Luke Morrow, a member of the United States Marine Corps, who marries Cassie Salazar, played by Sofia Carson, for her to receive military benefits; they then unexpectedly fall in love. To prepare, Galitzine went through basic Marine training.

In 2023, Galitzine portrayed a high school football player named Jeff in Emma Seligman's sex comedy film Bottoms. When talking about the film, Galitzine stated that he had wanted to act in a comedy, and enjoyed improvising on set. He portrayed the fictional Prince Henry in the romantic comedy film Red, White & Royal Blue, based on the 2019 novel of the same name opposite Taylor Zakhar Perez. The film released on Amazon Prime Video and was the streaming service's number one movie globally and one of the top three most-watched romantic comedies of all time in its premiere weekend; Galitzine was also praised for his performance by Rolling Stone and ABC News. For the role, Galitzine was nominated at the 4th Astra TV Awards for Best Actor in a Limited Series or TV Movie. He is due to reprise the role for a sequel, titled Red, White & Royal Wedding, directed by Jamie Babbit.

In 2024, Galitzine starred as George Villiers in the Sky Studios historical psychodrama series Mary & George, alongside Julianne Moore. Galitzine joined the cast after screenwriter D. C. Moore sent him the script and he became "fascinated" with the story. He described George Villiers as a "slam dunk" of a role. Lucy Mangan for The Guardian praised Galitzine for giving depth to a character otherwise treated superficially within the story. Alison Herman for Variety highlighted that his performance in Mary & George was a significant shift from his romantic comedy roles in Red, White & Royal Blue and The Idea of You.

Galitzine starred alongside Anne Hathaway in the film The Idea of You (2024), based on a novel with the same title, and portrayed a member of a fictional boy band, August Moon, who enters a relationship with Hathaway's character, a divorced mother. He received the role when, in his audition performance, he chose an Alabama Shakes song which led to a spontaneous dance between him and Hathaway. To prepare for the role, he took part in a "boy band boot camp" that included dance rehearsals and stage training. He was also the only cast member to provide vocals for the film's soundtrack, completing the recording process in under a week. Executive music producer Savan Kotecha developed the songs specifically around Galitzine's voice after hearing his audition. Critics drew comparisons of August Moon to One Direction, with Galitzine saying that his character, Hayes Campbell, was not inspired by Harry Styles. While promoting the film, Galitzine told GQ that he was uncomfortable with being primarily judged on his appearance and emphasised that he wanted to be taken seriously as an actor. Galitzine provided vocals on all songs by the band in the soundtrack. He received nominations at the Guild of Music Supervisors Awards and the Hollywood Music in Media Awards for the Best Song Written and/or Recorded for a Film and the Best Original Song in a Feature Film respectively for the movie's eponymous song. Galitzine was nominated for Breakthrough Performer of the Year at the 2024 Gold Derby Awards.

In May 2024, it was announced that Galitzine had been cast as He-Man for the upcoming live action film Masters of the Universe. To prepare, he pursued physical training, including bench-pressing and weightlifting. He also said he ate 4,000 calories worth of food each day to bulk up. Filming wrapped in June 2025, and the film was released in the summer of 2026. Galitzine made his Met Gala debut in 2024. The same year, it was announced he would venture into voice acting as the lead in the Mexican animated adventure film Wings of Freedom, alongside Eva Longoria. Galitzine will portray Lieutenant Pirro, a Swift member of an animal airforce, who has to defeat an artificial intelligence being named Eternity who plans to take control over the world. The film's co-producer Gregory Ouanhon said the decision to hire Galitzine came because he had "a certain panache, elegance and a presence, in addition to a great sense of humor".

In April 2025, it was announced that Galitzine was set to star opposite Bill Skarsgård in The Mosquito Bowl, directed by Peter Berg and based on a book written by Buzz Bissinger. The movie follows the Mosquito Bowl football game during World War II. Filming commenced in Queensland in August of that year. Galitzine portrays John McLaughry. In May, it was reported that he would lead in The Return Of Stanley Atwell alongside Ella Purnell. Galitzine appeared in the ensemble cast of The Sheep Detectives, released on 8 May 2026. Galitzine starred as Manfred in 100 Nights of Hero, which released in December 2025. It was announced in June 2026 that Galitzine was set to portray Hoyt Richards in a new film.

== Other ventures ==
In 2023, Galitzine was named the first global menswear ambassador for the luxury fashion house Fendi. He modelled for the brand's Menswear Fall/Winter 2023–24 global campaign. In 2024, Galitzine had a partnership with the dating app Bumble. The following year, he was named global fragrance ambassador for Emporio Armani.

== Personal life ==
Galitzine has attention deficit hyperactivity disorder, being diagnosed as a child. He has spoken about dealing with impostor syndrome regarding his success within acting. He supports the football club Arsenal. Galitzine was raised in the Greek Orthodox faith. Galitzine describes his sexual orientation as straight.

== Filmography ==
Key
†	Denotes films that have not yet been released

=== Film ===
Year	Title	Role	Notes	Ref.
2014	The Beat Beneath My Feet	Tom Heath		
2016	High Strung	Johnnie Blackwell		
2016	Handsome Devil	Conor Masters		
2017	The Changeover	Sorensen Carlisle		
2019	Share	A.J.		
2019	After Louise	Barista	Uncredited	
2020	The Craft: Legacy	Timmy Andrews		
2021	Cinderella	Prince Robert		
2022	Purple Hearts	Luke Morrow		
2023	Bottoms	Jeff		
2023	Red, White & Royal Blue	Prince Henry Hanover-Stuart Fox		
2024	The Idea of You	Hayes Campbell		
2025	100 Nights of Hero	Manfred		
2026	The Sheep Detectives	Elliot Matthews		
2026	Masters of the Universe	Prince Adam Glenn / He-Man		
2026	The Mosquito Bowl	John McLaughry		
TBA	Red, White & Royal Wedding †	Prince Henry Hanover-Stuart Fox	Post-production	
TBA	The Return of Stanley Atwell †	Stanley Atwell	Post-production	
TBA	A Matter of Time †	TBA	Filming	

=== Television ===
Year	Title	Role	Notes	Ref.
2015	Legends	Angelo	Episode: "The Legend of Terrence Graves"	
2017	The Watcher in the Woods	Mark Fleming	TV film	
2019	Chambers	Elliott Lefevre	Main role; 10 episodes	
2024	Mary & George	George Villiers	Lead role; miniseries	

== Discography ==
=== Soundtrack albums ===
List of soundtrack albums, with selected details and chart positions
Title	Album details	Peak chart positions			
Title	Album details	US	AUS	SPA	UK
The Beat Beneath My Feet	Released: 11 May 2015; Formats: Digital download, streaming; Label: Yellow Boat Music	—	—	—	—
Cinderella	Released: 3 September 2021; Formats: CD, digital download, streaming; Label: Epic, Columbia, Sony Music	127	86	94	— (Note: Cinderella did not enter the UK Albums Chart, but peaked at number 14 on the UK Album Downloads Chart.)
The Idea of You (as part of August Moon)	Released: 2 May 2024; Formats: CD, LP, digital download, streaming; Label: Arista, Sony Music	—	—	—	— (Note: The Idea of You did not enter the UK Albums Chart, but peaked at number 1 on the UK Soundtrack Albums.)
"—" denotes a recording that did not chart or was not released in that territory.

=== Singles ===
As lead artist

List of singles as lead artist, showing year released and album name
Title	Year	Album	Ref.
"Comfort"	2022	Non-album single	
"Dance Before We Walk" (original or acoustic version as part of August Moon)	2024	The Idea of You	
"Closer" (original or remix with AUR as part of August Moon)	2024	The Idea of You	
"Taste" (original or R3hab remix as part of August Moon)	2024	The Idea of You	
"Guard Down" (as part of August Moon)	2024	The Idea of You	
"So Cold" (as part of August Moon)	2024	The Idea of You	

=== Promotional singles ===
List of promotional singles, showing year released and album name
Title	Year	Album	Ref.
"Honey"	2017	Non-album promotional single	
"Somebody to Love"	2021	Cinderella	
"The Idea of You" (with Anne-Marie)	2024	The Idea of You	

== Awards and nominations ==
Awards and nominations received by Nicholas Galitzine
Award	Year	Category	Nominated work	Result	Ref.
Astra Awards	2024	Best Actor in a Limited Series or TV Movie	Red, White & Royal Blue	Nominated	
Critics' Choice Super Awards	2026	Best Actor in a Superhero Movie	Masters of the Universe	Nominated	
Gold Derby Awards	2024	Breakthrough Performer of the Year	—	Nominated	
Guild of Music Supervisors Awards	2025	Best Song Written and/or Recorded for a Film	The Idea of You	Nominated	
Hollywood Music in Media Awards	2024	Best Original Song in a Feature Film	The Idea of You	Nominated	
Hollywood Music in Media Awards	2024	Best Onscreen Performance in a Feature Film	The Idea of You	Nominated	
Women Film Critics Circle	2024	Best Screen Couple (Note: With Anne Hathaway)	The Idea of You	Nominated	
