= Million to One =

2021 promotional single by Camila Cabello

Promotional single by Camila Cabello

from the album Cinderella
- Released: July 21, 2021
- Genre: Pop rock
- Length: 3:24
- Label: Epic
- Songwriters: Camila Cabello; Scott Harris
- Producers: Harris; Anne Preven (misc.); Matt Rad (misc.)

Camila Cabello promotional singles chronology
"Real Friends" (2017)	"Million to One" (2021)	"It Takes Two" (2023)

Music video
- "Million to One" on YouTube

"Million to One" is a song by American singer Camila Cabello from the 2021 soundtrack Cinderella. The song was written by Cabello, Scott Harris and produced by the latter. It was released on July 21, 2021, through Epic Records, as the first promotional single from the soundtrack.

== Background and promotion ==
In April 2019 it was announced that Camila Cabello was working on the soundtrack for the film Cinderella. In October 2020, Idina Menzel confirmed that "[she and Camila] both have original songs as well." In June 2021, a snippet of the song was featured in the teaser trailer of the film, when the music director of the film Keith Harrison teased the title of the song. On July 28, 2021 a demo version of the song which was recorded in 2019 was leaked on the internet. On August 27, 2021, a snippet of the pop remix was released on TikTok. The pop remix was officially released on September 3, 2021, along with the deluxe edition of the soundtrack.

== Music video ==
The music video for the original song, directed by Kay Cannon, premiered on August 31, 2021, on Cinderella's official Vevo channel.

== Track listings ==
Digital download
No.	Title	Length
1.	"Million to One"	3:24

Digital download – Pop remix
No.	Title	Length
1.	"Million to One" (Remix)	3:23

== Credits and personnel ==
Credits adapted from Tidal.

- Camila Cabello – vocals, songwriting
- Scott Harris – songwriting, production
- Anne Preven – miscellaneous production
- Matt Rad – miscellaneous production
- Tony Maserati – mixing
- Bart Schoudel – vocal production
- Dave Kutch – mastering

== Charts ==
Chart performance for "Million to One"
Chart (2021)	Peak position
New Zealand Hot Singles (RMNZ)	32
UK Singles Downloads (OCC)	48
UK Sales (Official Charts Company)	50

== Reprises ==
"Million to One (Reprise)"

Song by Camila Cabello

from the album Cinderella
- Released: September 3, 2021
- Length: 1:15
- Label: Epic; Columbia
- Songwriters: Cabello; Scott Harris
- Producers: Anne Preven; Matt Rad (misc.)

"Million to One / Could Have Been Me (Reprise)"

Song by Camila Cabello and Nicholas Galitzine

from the album Cinderella
- Released: September 3, 2021
- Length: 3:24
- Label: Epic; Columbia
- Songwriters: Cabello; Scott Harris; Rick Parkhouse; Adam Slack; Luke Spiller; George Tizzard; Joshua Wilkinson
- Producers: Anne Preven; Matt Rad (misc.)

"Million to One (Reprise)" and "Million to One / Could Have Been Me (Reprise)" are the reprises of the song "Million to One" from Cinderella. The first reprise like the original is sung by Camila Cabello but the second reprise is a mashup containing Cinderella co-star Nicholas Galitzine singing "Could Have Been Me" by the Struts.

=== Credits and personnel ===
Credits adapted from Tidal.

- Camila Cabello – vocals, songwriting
- Nicholas Galitzine – vocals
- Kay Cannon – arrangement
- Keith Harrison – arrangement
- Anne Preven – production
- David Campbell – orchestra
- Scott Harris – songwriting
- Matt Rad – miscellaneous production
- Tony Maserati – mixing
- Dave Kutch – mastering

== Release history ==
Release dates, formats, and versions of "Million to One”
Region	Date	Format	Label	Version(s)	Ref.
Various	July 21, 2021	Digital download; streaming	Epic; Columbia	Original	
Various	September 3, 2021	Digital download; streaming	Epic; Columbia	Reprises	
Various	September 3, 2021	Digital download; streaming	Epic; Columbia	Pop remix	
