= The Mosquito Bowl (novel) =

2022 American novel

- The first edition cover
- Author: Buzz Bissinger
- Language: English
- Genre: Narrative; Historical fiction
- Set in: Mosquito Bowl; Battle of Okinawa
- Publisher: Harper
- Publication date: 2022
- Publication place: United States
- Pages: 480
- ISBN: 978-0062879929

The Mosquito Bowl: A Game of Life and Death in World War II is a 2022 sports narrative novel written by the American author Buzz Bissinger. It follows the Mosquito Bowl, an American football game played during World War II in Guadalcanal.

== Premise ==
On the island of Guadalcanal on December 24, 1944, the 4th and the 29th Marine Regiments played an American football game called the Mosquito Bowl. The teams consisted of the country's best college football players, including future NFL players. From the 65 players of the game, 15 died the following year in the Battle of Okinawa.

== Development ==
Although unsure about when he first heard about the Mosquito Bowl game, the author Buzz Bissinger believes that he first came across the story while working with Caitlyn Jenner on a memoir about her father, who was part of the troops for the Normandy landings and the liberation of the Buchenwald concentration camp. Bissinger recalled feeling compelled by "the patriotism" of Jenner's father. Following the experience, he conducted research and wrote his book over the course of five years, which also led to research about his own father, Harry G Bissinger, who also served on the Marine Corps.

== Reception ==
The book received positive reviews. Douglass K. Daniel for Associated Press praised the book, especially the characterization and for its depiction of war. However, he criticized the book's misleading title, as the game itself "takes up less than a page". Jay Jennings for The New York Times similarly praised the novel for its characterization and narrative, but criticized it for the title.

In 2025, it was announced that a film adaptation titled The Mosquito Bowl and directed by Peter Berg was in the works. It will star Nicholas Galitzine, Bill Skarsgård, Ray Nicholson, and Tom Francis in the leading roles, and is expected to release on Netflix in 2026.
