= The Idea of You (soundtrack) =

2024 motion picture soundtrack

The Idea of You (Original Motion Picture Soundtrack)

Soundtrack album by August Moon and Nicholas Galitzine
- Released: May 2, 2024
- Recorded: 2024
- Length: 32:24 (standard); 50:44 (deluxe)
- Labels: Arista; Sony Music
- Producer: Savan Kotecha (exec.)

Singles from The Idea of You (Original Motion Picture Soundtrack)
- 1. "Dance Before We Walk" Released: March 6, 2024; 2. "Taste" Released: April 12, 2024; 3. "Closer" Released: April 26, 2024; 4. "Guard Down" Released: May 24, 2024; 5. "So Cold" Released: July 26, 2024

The Idea of You (Original Motion Picture Soundtrack) is the soundtrack to the 2024 film of the same name directed by Michael Showalter starring Anne Hathaway and Nicholas Galitzine. The film's soundtrack featured 10 songs performed by the fictional band August Moon and co-written by Savan Kotecha who served as the executive music producer. It also featured a suite from the score composed by Siddhartha Khosla.

The soundtrack, distributed by Arista Records and Sony Music, was released alongside the film on May 2, 2024, in digital platforms, while it was physically released the following day. It was further preceded by a deluxe edition of the album consisting of four live performances of the songs from the band.

== Production ==
According to music producer, Savan Kotecha, the only challenge was to have "songs that felt big" making the fictional band August Moon larger-than-life. The film's music supervisors Frankie Pine and Marcus Tamkin have cited several boy bands as inspiration, notably includes One Direction, Maroon 5, NSYNC and BTS. Kotecha who had previously worked with the former in few of the songs, had opined that the music in the film will not be mostly based on that particular band. The lead singer of the boy band, Hayes Campbell, is portrayed by Galitzine who also hails a musical background. With his casting, matching the on-screen and off-screen personalities of the character, Kotecha added that, "I was treating it like Hayes [Campbell] was a real person. Based on my own experiences, and conversations that I"d had with artists, I know who he would be, and what he would be feeling."

Kotecha wanted the original songs to "illustrate August Moon"s evolution from shiny new boy band to radio mainstays". The songs from the film, indicates the band's creative control with their attempts for more substance and texture in the lyrics and music and chronologically follow Campbell's development, both as a character and musician, in order to work in the film's context. "Taste" being an "edgier, sexier" song was featured as the fictional band's second album, while "Guard Down" was from their third album which showcases the "pitfalls of fame". "Closer" was described as the indicator of Solène Marchand and Campbell' romantic relationship at Coachella. The song "Dance Before We Walk" had a "bubbly" and "teenybopper-ish", which played during Campbell's departure from the band. The song appear "in bits and pieces" revolving around piano and guitar interludes and lyrics written sporadically throughout. This was meant to explore Campbell's creative progression of a solo singer-songwriter while also being a part of the development of Campbell and Marchand's relationship. "The Idea of You" and "Go Rogue" showcased Hayes' growth as a solo artist. The only pre-existing song from the soundtrack was "I Got You" which had additional production from Ilya Salmanzadeh and Babyface.

Kotecha curated and composed the songs for nearly two to three months beginning June 2023, to shape it around Galitzine's vocals. Galitzine recorded his vocals at Sweden which took him three days, while normally it would take three weeks, with recording each song would take two days. He then recruited few of his friends and collaborators to serve as the remainder of the band members and background vocalists.

== Marketing and release ==
The soundtrack preceded with the first single "Dance Before We Walk" released on March 6, 2024. It was followed by "Taste" and "Closer" on April 12 and 26, respectively. The soundtrack was digitally released on May 2, 2024, coinciding with the film's streaming release on Amazon Prime Video, while it was released in CD and vinyl LP, the following day. An accompanying deluxe edition featuring live performances of four songs from the band was released on the same day as the film.

== Critical reception ==
Wendy Ide of The Observer felt that "some of the music is insipid (although Galitzine, performing his own vocals, acquits himself soulfully)". Rafael Motamayor of IndieWire described the soundtrack as "catchy", while Richard Lawson of Vanity Fair deciphered it as "believable bops". Fletcher Peters of The Daily Beast summarised "The songs, too, are the same kind of 'stuck in your head all day' as 1D [One Direction] hits". Isabella Soares of Collider wrote "The music, written by Savan Kotecha, is boy band material, but the emphasis on only Galitzine's vocals makes the whole idea of him being part of a group, rather than a solo act, unconvincing." Sage Dunlap of Paste wrote "The original songs are nothing more than supermarket ambience and nauseating radio replays in the world of August Moon, but for us, the boy band frenzy feels nostalgic and charming. The songs are easily placed as music to make preteens swoon, and Galitzine"s suave presence helps make the act believable." Rocco T. Thompson of Slant Magazine wrote "the handful of August Moon tracks aren"t trying to ape a certain boy band sound so much as serve as solid pop ditties in their own right".

== Track listing ==
The Idea of You (Original Motion Picture Soundtrack) standard edition track listing
No.	Title	Artist(s)	Length
1.	"Taste"	August Moon	3:04
2.	"Dance Before We Walk"	August Moon	2:38
3.	"The Idea of You"	Nicholas Galitzine; Anne-Marie	3:06
4.	"Closer"	August Moon	2:47
5.	"I Got You"	August Moon	3:08
6.	"Guard Down"	August Moon	2:33
7.	"Go Rogue"	Nicholas Galitzine	2:42
8.	"The Idea of You" (acoustic version)	Nicholas Galitzine	2:15
9.	"Dance Before We Walk" (acoustic version)	Nicholas Galitzine; August Moon	2:23
10.	"Taste" (R3hab remix)	August Moon; R3hab	2:02
11.	"Score Suite"	Siddhartha Khosla	5:46
Total length:			32:24

The Idea of You (Original Motion Picture Soundtrack) deluxe edition bonus tracks
No.	Title	Artist(s)	Length
12.	"So Cold"	August Moon	2:41
13.	"The Idea of You" (Hayes solo)	Nicholas Galitzine	3:06
14.	"Taste" (live from Barcelona)	August Moon	3:35
15.	"Guard Down" (live from the Desert)	August Moon	2:42
16.	"Closer" (live from the Desert)	August Moon	3:04
17.	"I Got You" (live from the Desert)	August Moon	3:10
Total length:			50:44

== Additional music ==
External audio
- The Idea of You playlist curated by Spotify featuring songs from the original soundtrack and other non-album songs used in the film

The film features the following songs that are not featured in the soundtrack, which includes:

- "Light On" – Maggie Rogers
- "If We Ever Broke Up" – Mae Stephens
- "Paper Bag" – Fiona Apple
- "Pay Your Way in Pain" – St. Vincent
- "Digital Witness" – St. Vincent
- "Actor Out of Work" – St. Vincent
- "I Go" (edit) – Peggy Gou
- "Stranger" – Chris Lake
- "Les Fleurs" – Minnie Riperton
- "Dance Hall Days" – Wang Chung
- "In Your Room" – The Bangles
- "Let's Groove" – Earth, Wind & Fire
- "More, More, More" – Andrea True
- "I Can Dream About You" – Dan Hartman
- "Battez-vous" – Brigitte
- "Voilà" – Jeanne Cherhal

== Charts ==
Chart performance for The Idea of You (Original Motion Picture Soundtrack)
Chart (2024)	Peak position
UK Compilation Albums (Official Charts)	15
UK Soundtrack Albums (Official Charts)	1

== Release history ==
Release dates and formats for The Idea of You (Original Motion Picture Soundtrack)
Region	Date	Editions	Format(s)	Label	Ref.
Various	May 2, 2024	Standard	Digital download; streaming	Arista; Sony Music	
Various	May 3, 2024	Standard	CD; vinyl	Arista; Sony Music	
Various	May 3, 2024	Deluxe	Digital download; streaming; CD; vinyl	Arista; Sony Music	

== Original score ==
The Idea of You (Original Motion Picture Score)

Film score by Siddhartha Khosla
- Released: May 17, 2024
- Genre: Film score
- Length: 30:10
- Labels: Arista; Sony Music
- Producer: Siddhartha Khosla

Siddhartha Khosla chronology
Elsbeth (2024)	The Idea of You (2024)	A Family Affair (2024)

The Idea of You (Original Motion Picture Score) is the second album for the film featuring the original score composed by Siddhartha Khosla released through Arista Records and Sony Music on May 17, 2024.

The Idea of You (Original Motion Picture Score) track listing
No.	Title	Length
1.	"Longing"	1:14
2.	"Warehouse"	2:33
3.	"Art Gallery"	2:42
4.	"Hotel Visit"	3:12
5.	"Text Warning"	2:27
6.	"Painting"	1:26
7.	"Texting..."	1:29
8.	"In the Rain"	1:13
9.	"Solene Flies Home"	1:40
10.	"Have to Go"	1:19
11.	"How the Story Goes"	1:56
12.	"Airport Ride"	1:21
13.	"The Hardest Part"	1:52
14.	"Score Suite"	5:46
Total length:		30:10
