= Brent Comer =

American actor

- Born: March 2, 1996 (age 30); Frederick, Maryland, US
- Education: Governor Thomas Johnson High School; James Madison University
- Occupations: Actor; singer
- Years active: 2019–present
- Partner: McKenzie Kurtz (2025–present)

Brent Comer (born March 2, 1996) is an American actor and singer. A native of Frederick, Maryland, Comer first developed an interest in acting during high school, and he studied musical theater at James Madison University. Following a series of small scale roles, Comer obtained his first professional acting role in a production of Les Misérables, which ended abruptly due to the COVID-19 pandemic. He was later cast in The Outsiders La Jolla Production in 2023, and was nominated for the Grammy Award for Best Musical Theater Album after it transferred to Broadway in 2024. His film debut will be in The Mosquito Bowl (2026).

== Early life and education ==
Comer is from Frederick, Maryland. He has two older brothers. He attended Monocacy Middle School and Governor Thomas Johnson High School, the former being where he read The Outsiders for the first time, the play adaptation of which he later acted in. His interest in acting began in Governor Thomas Johnson High School after mistakenly joining a musical theater elective instead of his intended newscasting one. He studied musical theater at James Madison University, graduating in 2019.

== Career ==
Comer began acting in small scale productions, including roles as the Baker in Into the Woods, Prince Eric in The Little Mermaid, and Melchior in Spring Awakening.

Comer's first professional acting role was in the 2019 staging of the musical Les Misérables in Sondheim Theatre. The COVID-19 pandemic halted the production and lost Comer the part; he also struggled to find roles, which led to him nearly quitting acting. During the pandemic, he moved back to his native Maryland and worked in a distillery. Comer's breakthrough role came with Darrel Curtis in the musical The Outsiders in his Broadway debut. He auditioned for the show following a recommendation from his agent, and was cast in July 2022. He initially portrayed the character Paul and was an understudy for Darrel, played by Ryan Vasquez, from February to April 2023 at La Jolla Playhouse, California. After Vasquez left the production, Comer auditioned for the role, and was eventually hired. Comer was nominated for the Grammy Award for Best Musical Theater Album for his performance as one of the four featured singers on the album recording of the musical. He performed at the 77th Tony Awards in 2024 alongside the rest of The Outsiders cast, where the play received 12 nominations.

Comer will make his onscreen debut with The Mosquito Bowl (2026), a film about the Mosquito Bowl game during World War II. He will play George Murphy, an American football quarterback who studied at the University of Notre Dame. He took a leave of absence from The Outsiders to film the project. In addition to acting, Comer is a singer. In 2025, he performed his debut concert at 54 Below in New York City with Benjamin Rauhala.

== Personal life ==
Comer lives in Astoria, Queens as of 2025.

Comer has been in a public relationship with Broadway actress McKenzie Kurtz since August of 2025.

== Acting credits ==
Key
†	Denotes films that have not yet been released

=== Film ===
Year	Title	Role	Notes	Ref.
2026	The Mosquito Bowl	George Murphy		

=== Theatre ===
Year(s)	Title	Role	Venue	Ref.
2019	Les Misérables	—N/a	Sondheim Theatre	
2023	The Outsiders	Paul	La Jolla Playhouse	
2023	The Outsiders	Darrel Curtis	Broadway	

=== Other productions ===
- We Chose to Go to the Moon (2026)

== Awards and nominations ==
Awards and nominations received by Brent Comer
Award	Year	Category	Nominated work	Result	Ref.
Grammy Awards	2025	Best Musical Theater Album	The Outsiders	Nominated	
