= Cinderella (2021 soundtrack) =

2021 soundtrack album by Cinderella Original Motion Picture Cast

Cinderella (Original Motion Picture Soundtrack)
- Standard edition cover. The deluxe and digital cover features the same image, except with no bottom caption.

Soundtrack album by Cinderella Original Motion Picture Cast
- Released: September 3, 2021
- Recorded: January – March 2020
- Genre: Pop rock
- Length: 46:13
- Label: Epic; Columbia; Sony Music
- Producer: Anne Preven; Ron Fair; Nico Stadi; Scott Harris

Cinderella (Original Motion Picture Soundtrack) is the soundtrack album to the 2021 film, Cinderella. The soundtrack was released by Epic Records in the United States, Columbia Records in the United Kingdom, and Sony Music labels globally. "Million to One", performed by Camila Cabello, was released on July 21, 2021, as the first promotional single of the soundtrack. "Somebody to Love", performed by Nicholas Galitzine, was released on August 3, 2021 as an instant grant second promotional single, along with the pre-order for the album. "Dream Girl (Nile Rodgers Remix)", performed by Idina Menzel, was released on September 9, 2021, as the third promotional single.

== Background ==
In April 2019, it was announced that Camila Cabello was working on the music for the film. In October, 2020, Idina Menzel confirmed that "[she and Camila] both have original songs as well." On August 2, 2021, it was announced by the director Kay Cannon that the soundtrack would be released by Epic Records on September 3, 2021.

== Commercial performance ==
In the United Kingdom, Cinderella debuted at number 2 on the Official Soundtrack Albums Chart, number 8 on the UK Compilation Chart, and number 14 on the UK Albums Downloads Chart. In Australia, the soundtrack debuted at 86 on the ARIA Top 100 Albums chart. In Spain, the soundtrack debuted at 94 on the PROMUSICAE top 100 albums chart. In the United States, the soundtrack debuted at number 2 on the Billboard Top Soundtrack chart and number 127 on the Billboard 200.

== Track listings ==
Standard edition
No.	Title	Writer(s)	Producers(s)	Length
1.	"Rhythm Nation / You Gotta Be" (Camila Cabello, Idina Menzel and cast)	Janet Jackson; James Harris III; Terry Lewis / Desirée Weekes; Ashley Ingram	Kay Cannon^{[a]}; Keith Harrison^{[a]}; Anne Preven; Matt Rad^{[b]}	4:37
2.	"Million to One" (Camila Cabello)	Cabello; Scott Harris	Harris; Preven^{[b]}; Rad^{[b]}; Bart Schoudel^{[c]}	3:23
3.	"The New Barry" (Ben Bailey Smith)	Cannon; Harrison; Jensen Karp	Cannon^{[a]}; Harrison^{[a]}; Preven; Rad^{[b]}	0:54
4.	"Somebody to Love" (Nicholas Galitzine and cast)	Freddie Mercury	Cannon^{[a]}; Harrison^{[a]}; Preven; Rad^{[b]}	3:46
5.	"Material Girl" (Idina Menzel and cast)	Peter Brown; Robert Rans	Cannon^{[a]}; Harrison^{[a]}; Preven; Rad^{[b]}	2:20
6.	"Am I Wrong" (Camila Cabello, Nicholas Galitzine, Idina Menzel and cast)	William Larsen; Vincent Dery; Abdoulie Jallow; Nicolay Sereba	Cannon^{[a]}; Harrison^{[a]}; Preven; Rad^{[b]}	3:23
7.	"Million to One (Reprise)" (Camila Cabello)	Cabello; Harris	Cannon^{[a]}; Harrison^{[a]}; Preven; Rad^{[b]}	1:15
8.	"Shining Star" (Billy Porter and cast)	Philip Bailey; Lorenzo Dunn; Maurice White	Cannon^{[a]}; Harrison^{[a]}; Preven; Rad^{[b]}	3:56
9.	"Whatta Man / Seven Nation Army" (Nicholas Galitzine and cast)	David Crawford; Hurby Azor; Cheryl James / Jack White	Cannon^{[a]}; Harrison^{[a]}; Preven; Rad^{[b]}	3:09
10.	"Perfect" (Camila Cabello and Nicholas Galitzine)	Ed Sheeran	Cannon^{[a]}; Harrison^{[a]}; Preven; Rad^{[b]}	3:07
11.	"Dream Girl" (Idina Menzel and cast)	Menzel; Laura Veltz	Ron Fair; Preven; Nico Stadi	2:58
12.	"Million to One (2nd Reprise) / Could Have Been Me" (Camila Cabello and Nicholas Galitzine)	Cabello; Harris / Rick Parkhouse; Adam Slack; Luke Spiller; George Tizzard; Joshua Wilkinson	Cannon^{[a]}; Harrison^{[a]}; Preven; Rad^{[b]}	1:17
13.	"Let's Get Loud" (Camila Cabello, Nicholas Galitzine, Idina Menzel and cast)	Gloria Estefan; Flavio Santander	Cannon^{[a]}; Harrison^{[a]}; Preven; Rad^{[b]}	5:29
14.	"Score Suite" (Mychael Danna and Jessica Weiss)	Danna; Weiss	Cannon^{[a]}; Harrison^{[a]}	6:35
Total length:				46:13

Deluxe edition
No.	Title	Writer(s)	Producer(s)	Length
6.	"Shot at the Crown" (Ben Bailey Smith)	Cannon; Harrison	Cannon^{[a]}; Harrison^{[a]}; Preven; Rad^{[b]}	0:54
12.	"Perfect (Reprise)" (Camila Cabello and Nicholas Galitzine)	Sheeran	Cannon^{[a]}; Harrison^{[a]}; Preven; Rad^{[b]}	1:18
14.	"Shoe Made of Glass" (Ben Bailey Smith)	Cannon; Harrison; Karp	Cannon^{[a]}; Harrison^{[a]}; Preven; Rad^{[b]}	1:14
17.	"Million to One (Remix)" (Camila Cabello)	Cabello; Harris	Harris; Preven^{[b]}; Rad^{[b]}; Schoudel^{[c]}	3:23
18.	"Dream Girl (Nile Rodgers Remix)" (Idina Menzel and cast)	Menzel; Veltz	Preven; Fair; Stadi	3:44
Total length:				56:49

=== Notes ===
- ^{^[a]} indicates an arranger
- ^{^[b]} indicates a miscellaneous producer
- ^{^[c]} indicates a vocal producer

== Charts ==
Chart performance for Cinderella
Chart (2021)	Peak position
Australian Albums (ARIA)	86
Spanish Albums (PROMUSICAE)	94
UK Compilation Albums (OCC)	8
UK Album Downloads (OCC)	14
UK Soundtrack Albums (OCC)	2
US Billboard 200	127
US Soundtrack Albums (Billboard)	2

== Release history ==
Release dates and formats for Cinderella
Region	Date	Format(s)	Label	Version(s)	Ref.
Various	September 3, 2021	CD	Epic; Columbia; Sony	Standard	
Various	September 3, 2021	Digital download; streaming	Epic; Columbia; Sony	Deluxe	
