= John McLaughry =

American football player and coach (1917–2007)

Biographical details
- Born: April 8, 1917; New Wilmington, Pennsylvania, U.S.
- Died: November 28, 2007 (aged 90); Providence, Rhode Island, U.S.

Playing career
- 1937–1939: Brown
- 1940: New York Giants
- Position: Back

Coaching career (HC unless noted)
- 1946: Connecticut (backfield)
- 1947–1949: Union (NY)
- 1950–1958: Amherst
- 1959–1966: Brown

Head coaching record
- Overall: 78–80–8

Accomplishments and honors

Awards
- Third-team All-American (1938)

John Jackson McLaughry (April 8, 1917 – November 28, 2007) was an American football player and coach. He participated in the Mosquito Bowl.

== Playing career ==
He attended Brown University, graduating in 1940 and earning All-American honors as a player. He was drafted in the third round of the 1940 NFL Draft. In 1940, he played one season with the New York Giants. While serving as a Marine in the 6th Division on Guadalcanal he participated in the Mosquito Bowl.

McLaughry was also a successful hammer thrower in track and field, placing runner-up at the 1939 USA Outdoor Track and Field Championships and 8th at the 1936 United States Olympic trials in that event.

== Coaching career ==
After serving in the Pacific theater during World War II he returned to football, becoming an assistant coach at the University of Connecticut. He then served as a head coach at Union College (1947–1949), Amherst College (1950–1958), and Brown University (1959–1966). While his career at his first two coaching jobs was highly successful, his time at Brown was considered a disappointment as he posted just one winning season in eight years. After his coaching career he became Director of Summer and Special Projects at Brown University and spent a great deal of his time painting before dying on November 28, 2007.

== Personal life ==
McLaughry was the son of Tuss McLaughry, head football coach at Westminster College (Pennsylvania) from 1915 to 1916, 1918, and 1921, head football coach at Amherst College from 1922 to 1925, head football coach at Brown from 1926 to 1940, and head football coach at Dartmouth College from 1941 to 1942 and 1945 to 1954, interrupted due to service in World War II. McLaughry thus played for his own father while in college. His mother was Florence Marguerite (née Jackson) McLaughry (1892-1985). He had an older sister, Jeanne Marguerite McLaughry Mahoney (1912-2007) and a younger brother, Robert DeOrmond McLaughry (1921-2016).

On May 22, 1948, in Rotterdam, New York, he married Anne Justine (née Van Dyck) Salisbury, who had been previously married and had a son, Edwin Bevier Salisbury (1941-2020). He and Anne had three children of their own: Richard Graham McLaughry (b. 1951), David William McLaughry (b. 1954), and Marguerite Justine McLaughry (b. 1956). Anne was the daughter of Louis Bevier Van Dyck Jr. (1889-1934) and his wife, Marguerite Justine (née Towle, 1890–1980). She was the third of eight children, and a descendant of Louis DuBois and the Hasbrouck family.

== Legacy ==
Nicholas Galitzine will portray McLaughry in the film The Mosquito Bowl (2026).

== Head coaching record ==
Year	Team	Overall	Conference	Standing	Bowl/playoffs
Union Dutchmen () (1947–1949)
1947	Union	3–5			
1948	Union	7–1			
1949	Union	7–0–1			
Union:		17–6–1			
Amherst Lord Jeffs (Little Three) (1950–1958)
1950	Amherst	4–3–1	0–1–1	2nd	
1951	Amherst	2–5–1	0–1–1	2nd	
1952	Amherst	4–3–1	1–0–1	1st	
1953	Amherst	7–0–1	1–0–1	1st	
1954	Amherst	6–2	2–0	1st	
1955	Amherst	3–4	1–1	2nd	
1956	Amherst	5–3	1–1	2nd	
1957	Amherst	7–1	1–1	2nd	
1958	Amherst	6–2	1–1	2nd	
Amherst:		44–23–4	8–6–2		
Brown Bears (Ivy League) (1959–1966)
1959	Brown	2–6–1	1–5–1	7th	
1960	Brown	3–6	1–6	T–7th	
1961	Brown	0–9	0–7	8th	
1962	Brown	1–6–2	0–6–1	8th	
1963	Brown	3–5	2–5	7th	
1964	Brown	5–4	3–4	T–5th	
1965	Brown	2–7	1–6	T–7th	
1966	Brown	1–8	0–7	8th	
Brown:		17–51–3	8–46–2		
Total:		61–74–7			
National championship Conference title Conference division title or championship game berth
