= McKenzie Kurtz =

American stage actress, singer and dancer (born 1997)

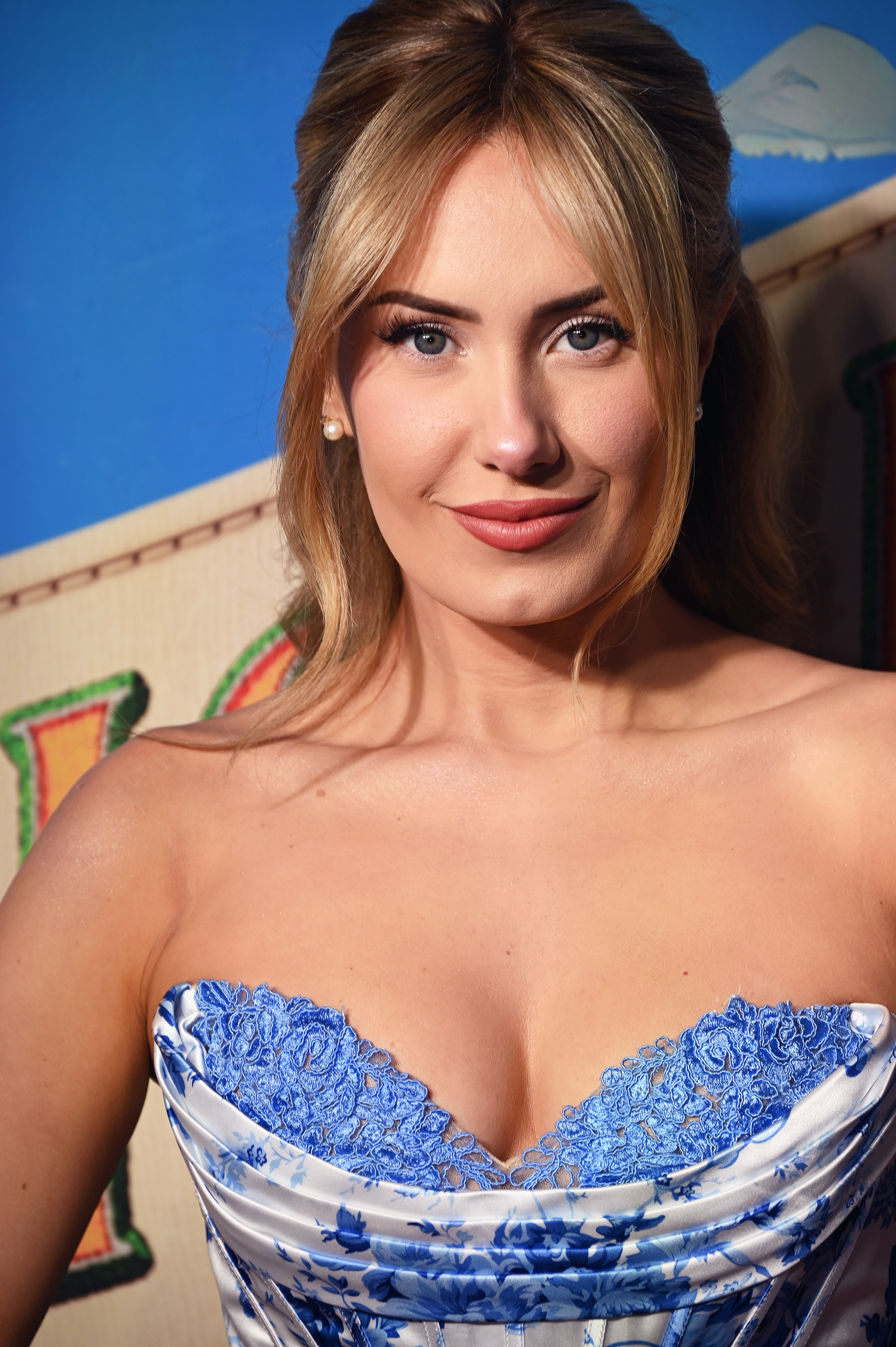
- Kurtz in 2026
- Born: January 13, 1997 (age 29); Milton, Georgia, United States
- Education: University of Michigan
- Occupations: Actress, singer, dancer
- Years active: 2019–present
- Partner: Brent Comer (2025–present)
- Website: mckenziekurtz.com

McKenzie Kurtz (born January 13, 1997) is an American stage actress, singer, and dancer. In her Broadway debut, she played the role of Anna in Frozen, before portraying Glinda in Wicked.

== Early life ==
Kurtz grew up in Alpharetta, Georgia. As a teenager, Kurtz was active in the theater program at Milton High School, playing the Lady of the Lake in the school's 2013 production of Monty Python's Spamalot, as well as Mary Poppins in the school's 2015 production of Mary Poppins. Kurtz was nominated for a Jimmy Award both years and was also a finalist in 2015. Kurtz is a 2019 graduate of the University of Michigan School of Music, Theatre, and Dance.

== Career ==
Kurtz played Ariel in a production of Footloose at The Muny directed by Christian Borle in 2019.

In Kurtz's 2020 Broadway debut, she played the role of Anna in the musical Frozen opposite Ciara Renée as Elsa and Ryan McCartan as Hans. According to Kurtz, her initial audition for the role did not go well, but she was personally offered a second chance by Kristen Anderson-Lopez after the co-songwriter of Frozen saw her sing at a "Women of Broadway" concert.

In 2021, Kurtz appeared in the ensemble of Annie Live! on NBC as the Star-to-Be.

From March 17 to April 11, 2022, Kurtz reprised her role of Anna in the Frozen US national tour. During the tour she was reunited with McCartan, her Broadway Hans.

Kurtz originated the role of Penelope in the 2022 world premiere musical of Trading Places at the Alliance Theatre in Atlanta. The production was directed by Kenny Leon.

On January 13, 2023, it was announced that Kurtz would assume the role of Glinda in the Broadway company of Wicked at the Gershwin Theatre on February 14, taking over for Brittney Johnson. Kurtz portrayed Glinda on the 20th anniversary of Wicked's premiere on Broadway; she left the show in March 2024.

Kurtz originated the role of Cassandra Stone in The Heart of Rock and Roll on Broadway in March 2024. In February 2025, she performed in the world premiere of Schmigadoon! as Betsy McDonough at the Kennedy Center in Washington, DC. When the production transferred to Broadway in the spring of 2026, she was nominated for a Drama Desk Award.

In 2025, Kurtz starred as Heather Chandler in Heathers at New World Stages.

== Personal life ==
Kurtz has been in a public relationship with Broadway actor Brent Comer since August 2025.

== Acting credits ==
=== Theatre ===
Year	Title	Role	Notes
2019	Footloose	Ariel Moore	The Muny
2020	Frozen	Anna	Broadway
2022	Frozen	Anna	National tour
2022	Trading Places	Penelope	Regional (World premiere)
2023–2024	Wicked	Glinda Upland	Broadway
2024	The Heart of Rock and Roll	Cassandra Stone	Broadway
2025	Schmigadoon!	Betsy McDonough	Kennedy Center
2025	Heathers: The Musical	Heather Chandler	Off-Broadway
2026	Schmigadoon!	Betsy McDonough	Broadway

=== Filmography ===
Year	Title	Role	Notes
2021	Annie Live!	Star to Be	
2022	She-Hulk: Attorney at Law	Heather	Episode: "Just Jen"

== Awards and nominations ==
Year	Award	Category	Work	Result	Ref.
2026	Drama Desk Award	Outstanding Featured Performance in a Musical	Schmigadoon!	Nominated	
2026	Dorian Awards	Outstanding Featured Performance in an Off-Broadway Production	Heathers: the Musical	Nominated	
2026	Actors’ Equity Foundation Awards	Clarence Derwent Award	Heathers: The Musical, Schmigadoon!	Won	
