= The Beat Beneath My Feet =

2014 film by John Williams

- Directed by: John Williams
- Written by: Michael Mueller
- Produced by: Raj Sharma; Fiona Gillies; Michael Mueller
- Starring: Luke Perry; Nicholas Galitzine; Lisa Dillon; Verity Pinter
- Edited by: Thomas Goldser
- Music by: Paul Cartledge; Geoff Jackson; Philip Jewson
- Production company: Scoop Films
- Release date: 7 December 2014 (British Independent Film Awards)
- Running time: 92 minutes
- Country: United Kingdom
- Language: English

The Beat Beneath My Feet is a 2014 British comedy-drama coming-of-age film starring Luke Perry and Nicholas Galitzine, in the latter's theatrical debut, and directed by John Williams in his directorial debut. It follows a socially outcast teenager, played by Galitzine, who dreams of becoming a rock musician, and is aided by a former rock star, played by Perry. Premiering at the British Independent Film Awards in December 2014, it received mixed reviews from critics.

== Plot ==
Tom Heath, a withdrawn teenager living in South London with his single mother Mary, dreams of becoming a rock musician. At school he is bullied by classmates, especially his rival Damien, and retreats into fantasies of stardom while hiding his passion from Mary, who disapproves of music due to Tom's father, Chris's, failed career as a musician. Chris shows little interest in Tom and eventually abandons the family, leaving Tom devastated. Struggling with isolation, Tom also has scars from past self-harm, which he has tried to overcome through playing the guitar.

When a new tenant moves into their council flat, Tom discovers he is Max Stone, an American former rock guitarist who vanished years earlier after his young son drowned and he was charged with tax fraud. Presumed dead, Max lives in hiding, blasting music day and night. Fascinated, Tom begs him for guitar lessons. Max angrily refuses, but Tom blackmails him by threatening to expose his identity. Though initially reluctant, Max eventually agrees, and the two begin an uneasy mentorship.

As Tom learns under Max's guidance, the pair grow closer, with Max slowly warming to the boy. Mary, unaware of their lessons, gradually begins to get along with Max. When she discovers he has been secretly mentoring Tom, she feels betrayed and lashes out, accusing Max of being unfit to guide a child. Shaken by her words and haunted by guilt over his own son's death, Max leaves a letter for Tom and withdraws from his life. Depressed, Tom relapses and self-harms.

Tom is approached by Felix, a girl from Damien's band whom he admires. She is impressed by a video of Tom playing with Max, and invites him to contribute as a songwriter. Tom agrees, but Damien steals his work and threatens to reveal Max's survival to the authorities. Feeling hopeless, Tom contemplates suicide on the roof of his building, but is stopped by Max, who urges him to channel his pain into music instead.

Determined, Tom enters the local battle of the bands competition. Initially paralysed by stage fright, he is supported by Felix, and together they begin to perform. Midway through, Max makes a surprise appearance, clean-shaven and revitalised, and joins Tom on stage. Their duet wins over the crowd, and videos of the performance quickly spread online.

Police arrive and arrest Max. Though Tom begs him to flee, Max chooses to face justice and is sentenced to three years in prison for tax fraud. Tom continues to visit him with Mary, and he begins a romantic relationship with Felix. The viral video of Tom and Max prompts fans to crowdfund £500,000, launching Tom into fame. Years later, Max is released from prison. Tom, now a confident young musician, reunites with him, and the two perform together, fulfilling Tom's dream of becoming a rock star.

== Cast ==
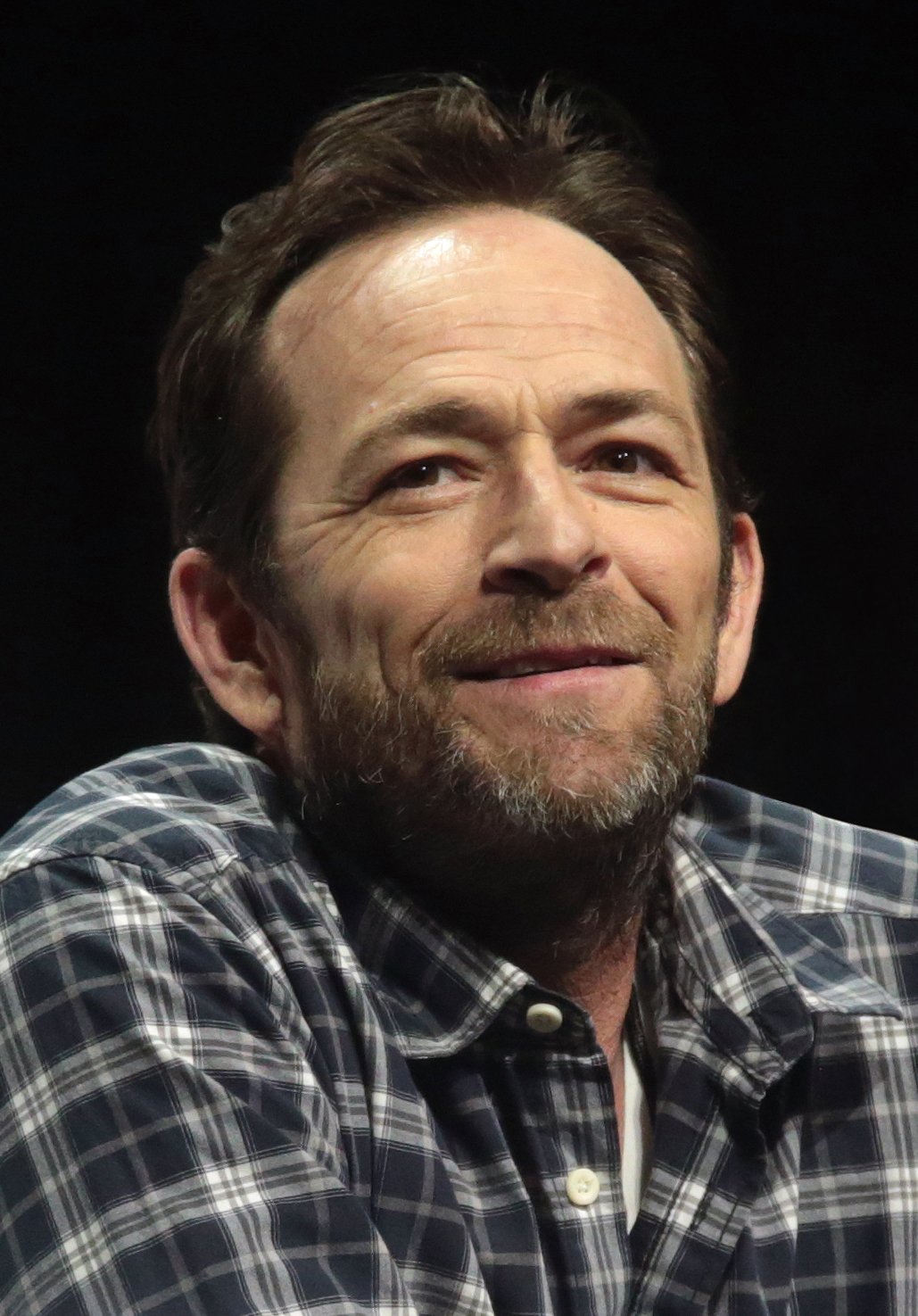
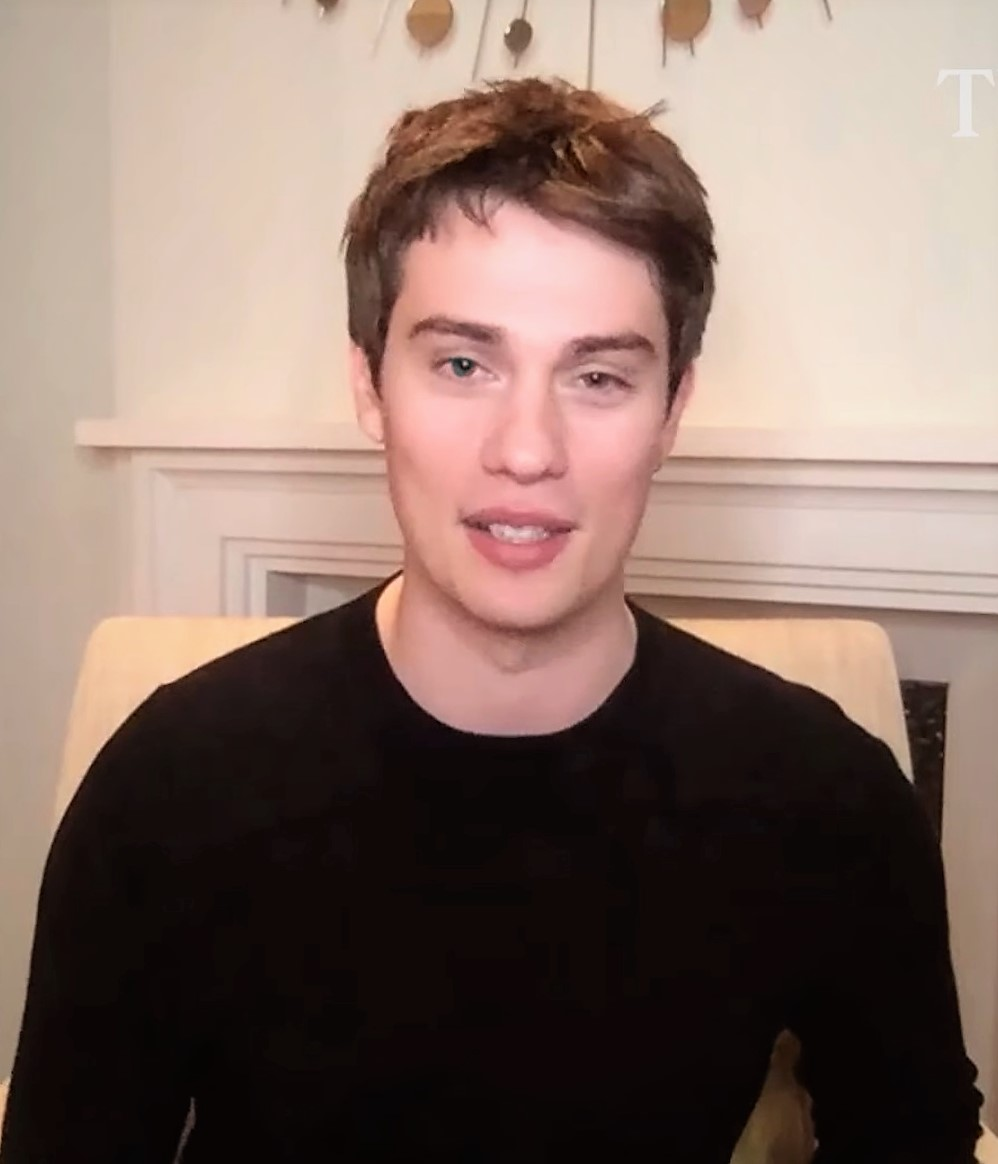
Luke Perry (left) and Nicholas Galitzine portray the leads.
- Luke Perry as Max Stone, a former rock musician who is now depressed and lives in a council flat next to Tom
- Nicholas Galitzine as Tom Heath, an outcast teenager who aspires to become a musician
- Lisa Dillon as Mary, Tom's mother
- Verity Pinter as Felix, a vocalist who Tom has a crush on
- Simon Lowe as Jonah
- James Tarpey as Damien, Tom's bully
- Ian Virgo as Chris, Tom's father
- Ewen Macintosh as a guitar salesman

== Production and release ==
A comedy-drama coming-of-age film produced by Scoop Films, it was directed by John Williams in his directorial debut. Raj Sharma, Fiona Gillies, and Michael Mueller served as the producers, while Puneet Gupta and Lynn Fordham served as the executive producers. Mueller was also the sole screenwriter of the movie. To fund promotion, Scoop Films launched a crowdfunding campaign to raise £75,000. It premiered at the British Independent Film Awards 2014. Screenings were later shown at the 65th Berlin International Film Festival on 11 February 2015. The film was Galitzine's theatrical debut.

== Reception ==
=== Critical response ===
The Beat Beneath My Feet received mixed reviews. Leslie Felperin for The Guardian criticised the film for relying on cliché tropes and unconvincing casting. While Luke Perry's performance was noted positively, Nicholas Galitzine was described as too conventionally attractive to convincingly portray a socially isolated teenager. The publication also found the music, a central element of the story, to be unoriginal and lacking in appeal. The Los Angeles Times described the film as slow-paced and lacking energy. Luke Perry's performance was praised, as were the interactions between Perry and Nicholas Galitzine. The Hollywood Reporter praised Galitzine's performance and compared his vocal ability to Tom McRae.

=== Accolades ===
Awards and nominations for The Beat Beneath My Feet
Award	Date of ceremony	Category	Nominee(s)	Result	Ref.
Berlin International Film Festival	11 February 2015	Crystal Bear	The Beat Beneath My Feet	Nominated	
British Independent Film Awards	7 December 2014	Raindance Maverick Award	The Beat Beneath My Feet	Nominated	
