= James Tarpey =

British actor

- Born: Greenwich, London, United Kingdom
- Occupation: Actor
- Years active: 2012–present

James Tarpey is a British actor. He was born in Greenwich, London, United Kingdom. He is best known for playing a Young Peter Page in the 2013 comic science fiction movie The World's End and playing Willow on the British sitcom After Hours since 2015. James is a keen skateboarder and guitarist.

== Career ==
James attended the BRIT school for performing arts. James made his stage debut at the Obie Theatre, London, playing the title role in Sarah Nivan's adaptation of Vernon God Little.

In 2012 he was cast as the lead in a short film called Callum, he played the title character Callum. James was nominated and won the 2013 Best Actor Award for the Cannes in a van, independent film festival award, for the lead role of Callum

He played a Young Peter Page in the 2013 comic science fiction movie The World's End. He played Damien in the movie The Beat Beneath My Feet and Nathan in the British independent science fiction movie Robot Overlords. He played Ted in the 2015 movie Hector. From 2015 he played Willow on the British sitcom series After Hours.

== Theatre ==
James made his London professional stage debut in the widely acclaimed First Love is the Revolution at the Soho Theatre in October 2015

== Selected filmography ==
=== Film ===
| Year | Title | Role | Notes |
|---|---|---|---|
| 2012 | Callum | Callum | Short film |
| 2013 | The World's End | Young Peter Page | |
| 2014 | The Beat Beneath My Feet | Damien | |
| 2014 | Robot Overlords | Nathan | |
| 2015 | Hector | Ted | |
| 2021 | The Drowning of Arthur Braxton | Arthur Braxton | |
| 2021 | The Shadow in My Eye | Reggie | |
| 2021 | A Little Italian Vacation | Rome | |
| 2021 | Sundown | Albert Thompson | |
| 2024 | Sebastian | Ben | |

=== Television ===
| Year | Title | Role | Notes |
|---|---|---|---|
| 2015 | After Hours | Willow | |
