= The Mosquito Bowl =

2026 film by Peter Berg

- Theatrical release poster
- Directed by: Peter Berg
- Screenplay by: Peter Berg; Mark L. Smith
- Based on: The Mosquito Bowl: A Game of Life and Death in World War II by Buzz Bissinger
- Produced by: Peter Berg; Brian Grazer; Alex Gayner
- Starring: Nicholas Galitzine; Bill Skarsgård; Ray Nicholson; Tom Francis
- Cinematography: Jacques Jouffret
- Edited by: Jon Otazua; Garret Donnelly
- Music by: Explosions in the Sky
- Production companies: Imagine Entertainment; Film 44
- Distributed by: Netflix
- Release dates: October 22, 2026 (AFI Fest); October 30, 2026 (United States)
- Running time: 127 minutes
- Country: United States
- Language: English
- Box office: $1 million

The Mosquito Bowl is a 2026 American war film directed, co-written, and produced by Peter Berg for Netflix. Based on the 2022 Buzz Bissinger non-fiction novel The Mosquito Bowl: A Game of Life and Death in World War II, the story depicts the lives of four American college football players who enlist in the marines and go on to play the eponymous football game prior to the Battle of Okinawa. The film stars Nicholas Galitzine, Bill Skarsgård, Ray Nicholson, and Tom Francis in the leading roles.

The film had its world premiere at the 2026 AFI Film Festival on October 22, 2026, before getting released in United States theaters on October 30, 2026. It received mixed reviews from critics.

== Plot ==
Various vignettes of college football games are shown highlighting the top performances of several top college athletes during the early 1940s. Their standout performances make them celebrities on their own campuses and single them out as exceptional athletes. Then a surprise attack by the Japanese on December 7th 1941 at Pearl Harbor seems to change the everyday priorities of the American public, and recreational activities like football and other sports seem to be reassessed by the general public as to their relative importance.

Four top American football players enlist in the United States Marine Corps after the attack on Pearl Harbor. While preparing for the Battle of Okinawa, they play a football game, the Mosquito Bowl, that later become famous.

== Cast ==
- Nicholas Galitzine as John McLaughry
- Bill Skarsgård as Bob Baumann
- Ray Nicholson as Tony Butkovich
- Tom Francis as Dave Schreiner
- Brent Comer as George Murphy
- Pat McAfee as a drill instructor
- Dominic Bogart as Wilkes
- Stacy Clausen as Avery
- Ella Newton as Jane

== Production ==
=== Development ===
The film is based on Buzz Bissinger's 2022 The Mosquito Bowl: A Game of Life and Death in World War II, which is about the Mosquito Bowl. While the television miniseries American Primeval, also directed by Peter Berg, was in post-production, a friend's son recommended that he make an adaption of the book during a dinner, following which Berg stated "everything just clicked." Production for the film began in 2025. The film is directed by Berg, and produced by Berg with Film 44, Brian Grazer with Imagine Entertainment, and Alex Gayner. Berg and Grazer previously collaborated on Friday Night Lights (2004), another sports film adaptation of Bissinger's work. Berg and American Primeval scribe Mark L. Smith co-wrote the script, while Ezra Emanuel serves as the executive producer. Production of the film was announced in April 2025, and will be distributed by Netflix. It is described as an action drama sports film.

=== Casting ===
In late April 2025, it was announced that the actors Nicholas Galitzine and Bill Skarsgård were cast in leading roles. The film also stars Ray Nicholson and Tom Francis. In July, Brent Comer joined the cast as George Murphy, a quarterback from the University of Notre Dame. Pat McAfee, a former NFL player, will also appear as a drill instructor.

=== Filming ===
The Mosquito Bowl began principal photography in August 2025 in Queensland, Australia. Berg praised the natural landscapes, calling it "cinematic gold" and "perfect" for the book's transition to a visual medium. Scenes were also shot in Richard Gouse Field at Brown Stadium in Providence, Rhode Island, for one day in November 2025. By December 2025, filming had wrapped.

=== Music ===
Explosions in the Sky, a post-rock band which has previously worked with Berg, composed the film score. The soundtrack album was released by Netflix Music, on October 30, 2026, the same day as the film's release in theaters.

== Release ==
The Mosquito Bowl had its world premiere at the 2026 AFI Film Festival on October 22, 2026. The film was released in U.S. theaters on October 30 before its Netflix premiere on November 25. Netflix will report this film's box office result.

== Box office ==
The film made €0.455 million from 349 locations in its opening weekend.

== Reception ==
On the review aggregator website Rotten Tomatoes, 42% of 38 critics' reviews are positive, with an average rating of 5.1/10. Metacritic, which uses a weighted average, assigned the film a score of 42 out of 100, based on 19 critics, indicating "mixed or average" reviews.

Robert Abele of the LA Times found the film to be disappointing, even though it's based on a well-received book, stating: "The real head-scratcher here, however, is that when the game finally arrives, it seems to fly by, another casualty of (director) Berg’s restless energy. An opportunity is lost for catharsis. Some of that feeling is there but it feels skimmed, not hard-won because of characterization or scene dynamics. I’ve never been more ready for a football game to be cinematically stirring, and more disappointed that it amounted to a supercut."

Tim Grierson of ScreenDaily lamented that the film "shows no interest in exploring themes like masculinity, instead delivering a pro forma war film that pays lip service to tired notions of sacrifice, heroism and brotherhood".
