= The Idea of You =

2024 film by Michael Showalter

- Release poster
- Directed by: Michael Showalter
- Screenplay by: Michael Showalter; Jennifer Westfeldt
- Based on: The Idea of You by Robinne Lee
- Produced by: Cathy Schulman; Gabrielle Union; Anne Hathaway; Robinne Lee; Eric Hayes; Michael Showalter; Jordana Mollick
- Starring: Anne Hathaway; Nicholas Galitzine
- Cinematography: Jim Frohna
- Edited by: Peter Teschner
- Music by: Siddhartha Khosla
- Production companies: Amazon MGM Studios; Welle Entertainment; I'll Have Another; Somewhere Pictures
- Distributed by: Amazon Prime Video
- Release dates: March 16, 2024 (SXSW); May 2, 2024 (United States)
- Running time: 116 minutes
- Country: United States
- Language: English

The Idea of You is a 2024 American romantic comedy drama film directed by Michael Showalter from a screenplay he co-wrote with Jennifer Westfeldt, based on the novel of the same name by Robinne Lee. Starring Anne Hathaway and Nicholas Galitzine, it chronicles the romantic relationship between a single mother and the lead singer of a popular boy band.

A film adaptation of the novel was announced in late 2018 by the producers Cathy Schulman and Gabrielle Union; no further development was made until in mid-2021 with the involvement of Westfeldt, Hathaway, Showalter, and Galitzine being announced. The film was shot by cinematographer Jim Frohna predominantly in Georgia, United States, during late 2022. Peter Teschner edited the film while Siddhartha Khosla composed the original score. Savan Kotecha composed and wrote the original songs.

The Idea of You premiered at South by Southwest on March 16, 2024, and was released on Amazon Prime Video on May 2, 2024. The film received positive reviews from critics.

== Plot ==
Solène Marchand is a divorced art gallery owner living in Los Angeles. As her 40th birthday nears, she plans a solo camping trip while her ex-husband Daniel takes their teen daughter Izzy and her friends to Coachella. When Daniel is called away by work at the last minute, Solène reluctantly agrees to forgo camping and accompany the teens to the festival.

Daniel had arranged for the teens to have a meet-and-greet at the festival with the boy band August Moon. In the VIP area, Solène enters what she believes is a bathroom, only to discover that it is actually the trailer of 24-year-old August Moon member Hayes Campbell. The pair flirt, although Solène, who is sixteen years older than Hayes, is uncomfortable with their attraction. Later, during August Moon's performance, Hayes changes the show's setlist, dedicating a song to her.

At Solène's birthday party, she is disillusioned with prospective suitors of her own age. Hayes shows up unannounced at Solène's gallery. After he buys every artwork on sale, Solène takes him to a friend's warehouse studio, where they discuss life and art. Solène invites him to her house for lunch to escape the paparazzi. She reveals her insecurities about her ex-husband's affair, and Hayes describes his desire to be taken seriously as a musician. They kiss passionately, but Solène rebuffs him.

Hayes deliberately leaves his watch behind. He finds Solène's phone number on the gallery invoice, and texts her to join him in New York City. With Izzy at summer camp, Solène meets him at his hotel, where they have sex. Hayes convinces her to travel with him on August Moon's European tour. Wishing to keep their relationship private, Solène keeps it a secret from Izzy and all of her associates.

As the tour continues, Solène and Hayes deepen their relationship. When the band vacations in the south of France, Solène becomes uncomfortable about her age in relation to the other women traveling with them. Hayes's bandmate Ollie and the others tell her that his dedication of a song to her is a tactic they use to impress women and that Hayes has previously pursued relationships with older women. Solène, feeling misled and disillusioned about the relationship, abruptly returns to Los Angeles. Daniel, who heard from an acquaintance that he spotted Solène and Hayes together in Italy, questions her about it, but she denies that she and Hayes are in a romantic relationship.

Soon afterward, photos of the relationship surface online, causing Solène to attract large amounts of sexist and ageist abuse. When she picks Izzy up at camp, her daughter is furious at having been lied to, but forgives her mother. She encourages Solène to visit the recording studio where Hayes is working, and they rekindle their relationship, beginning to date publicly. She and her family delete their social media accounts.

Daniel expresses concern to Solène about the impact of their relationship on Izzy, who is facing challenges at school as a result. Following a trip to New York, Hayes returns, and Solène ends the relationship once more. However, Hayes visits her home again, and they declare their love for each other. He suggests that they should reconsider resuming their relationship in five years once Izzy has completed her schooling and his popularity has faded. As he departs, Hayes leaves his watch behind again.

Five years later, with Izzy now studying in Chicago, Solène sees Hayes performing on The Graham Norton Show, where he mentions plans to visit Los Angeles. He returns to the gallery, where they share a joyous, tearful reunion.

== Cast ==
- Anne Hathaway as Solène Marchand, an art gallery owner
- Nicholas Galitzine as Hayes Campbell, a British popstar
- Ella Rubin as Izzy, Solène's teenage daughter
- Annie Mumolo as Tracy
- Reid Scott as Daniel, Solène's ex-husband
- Perry Mattfeld as Eva
- Jordan Aaron Hall as Zeke Randall
- Mathilda Gianopoulos as Georgia
- Meg Millidge as Claire
- Cheech Manohar as Jeremy
- Raymond Cham Jr. as Oliver Hoyt-Knight
- Jaiden Anthony as Adrian
- Viktor White as Simon
- Dakota Adan as Rory
- Roxy Rivera as Jodie
- Graham Norton as himself
- Brent Bailey as Todd
- Chandler Lovelle as Charlotte
- Nina Bloomgarden as Amber
- Hedy Nasser as Priya
- Grace Junot as Nancy

== Production ==
=== Development ===
In December 2018, it was announced that an adaptation of the Robinne Lee novel The Idea of You had been opted by Welle Entertainment with Cathy Schulman and Gabrielle Union producing. Union, who had been friends with Lee since the early 2000s, named the book amongst her ten favorites of all time in 2018. In June 2021, it was revealed that Jennifer Westfeldt had adapted the novel and Anne Hathaway was cast in the starring role while also serving as one of the producers.

=== Casting ===
In August 2022, Michael Showalter was confirmed as director. The following month, Nicholas Galitzine was added to the cast as the lead singer of "the hottest boyband on the planet", and in October, Ella Rubin was revealed to be playing Hathaway's daughter and that principal photography had commenced. The same month, Annie Mumolo, Reid Scott, Perry Mattfeld and Jordan Aaron Hall were revealed to have joined the cast as well as Jaiden Anthony, Raymond Cham, Vik White and Dakota Adan as the rest of the band Galitzine fronts.

=== Filming ===
Filming took place in Georgia in the cities of Atlanta, Savannah, and surrounding areas in October 2022.

Much of the artwork featured in the film were pieces done by real artists. Anne Hathaway and production designer Amy Williams worked together on sourcing art with Williams stating, "We worked really hard to make the art a focal point and make it authentic".

=== Music ===
The film features original songs performed by the fictional band August Moon, which were written by Savan Kotecha, who also served as the executive music producer. Galitzine performed vocals for a few of the songs. An album consisting of 11 tracks were released by Arista Records digitally, day-and-date with the film, which would be followed by the physical versions and the deluxe edition of the album featuring four live performances of the band's recordings, releasing the next day. The soundtrack was preceded with three singles: "Dance Before We Walk", "Taste" and "Closer".

In addition to the original music, the film features needle drops such as "Paper Bag" (1999) by Fiona Apple, "Pay Your Way in Pain" (2021) by St. Vincent, "Les Fleur" (1970) by Minnie Riperton, and "Dance Hall Days" (1983) by Wang Chung.

== Marketing ==
In December 2023, Amazon Prime Video, which acquired the distribution rights of the film, released an exclusive still from the film in their 2024 slate of original programming. The film's official trailer was released on March 6, 2024, and garnered over 125 million views on social media platforms, becoming the most-watched trailer for an original film released on a streaming platform.

== Release ==
The film had its world premiere at South by Southwest as the closing-night film on March 16, 2024. It was released as a Prime Video original film on May 2, 2024.

== Reception ==
On the review aggregator website Rotten Tomatoes, 80% of 184 critics' reviews are positive, with an average rating of 6.5/10. The website's consensus reads: "The Idea of You offers a welcome reminder that Anne Hathaway remains a thoroughly delightful romcom lead—and reaffirms that few filmmakers understand the genre better than Michael Showalter." Metacritic, which uses a weighted average, assigned the film a score of 67 out of 100, based on 37 critics, indicating "generally favorable" reviews.

Benjamin Lee of The Guardian wrote, "Showalter manages to make The Idea of You look and breathe like the grander films it comes after rather than the tinier ones it sits alongside [...] It's all not ultimately enough to truly transport us back to the genre's heyday but it's a damn sight better than what we've been forced to get used to." Peter Debruge of Variety wrote "The film version finds a solution that honors [Robinne] Lee's intentions while providing a more satisfying sense of closure for their on-and-off relationship". Alissa Wilkinson of The New York Times wrote, "The Idea of You succeeds mostly because of Hathaway's performance, though she and Galitzine spark and banter pleasurably". Alison Wilmore of Vulture wrote, "The Idea of You could stand to be a little more indulgent — it allows the real world to rush into its unexpected relationship almost before it gets going — but it's surprisingly seductive even with its restraint. Anyone can holler along to a One Direction song in the privacy of their home, but it's something else to reconnect with the feelings expressed by one of those big choruses."

Lovia Gyarkaye of The Hollywood Reporter wrote, "The Idea of You functions best as a carefree treat — a feel-good romantic comedy that delivers some laughs and bursts with the magnetism of its lead. That it manages to wiggle in some lessons about self-discovery is merely a bonus." Rafael Motamayor of IndieWire wrote that the film "does a complete love story, going beyond where most movies like these end to explore the moment a magical fling becomes something more, where a little 'let's see where this goes' becomes something worth fighting for, and maybe also losing." Richard Lawson of Vanity Fair wrote, "The Idea of You is glossy and smart, a cut above the slop so often served to its intended audience. It may force a neat ending, it may strain logic, it may leave some intriguing avenues unexplored, but The Idea of You is otherwise transporting, a fairy tale worthy of a big screen." Valerie Complex of Deadline Hollywood wrote that "Hathaway's performance offers moments of genuine emotion and connection that hint at the film's potential, which keeps things together long enough to be enjoyable."

Alejandra Martinez of TheWrap wrote, "What could have been a lukewarm romance is instead something much more surprising and sensual. In the hands of lesser performers and filmmakers, the premise could have quickly fallen apart. The Idea of You, however, has actors who know exactly what they need to bring to deliver a believable, compelling romance worth getting swept up in." Nikki Baughan of Screen Daily wrote that "the screenplay does not linger here, and soon diverts from the book's sombre climax to offer up a more audience-friendly ending." Fletcher Peters of The Daily Beast wrote, "The Idea of You is the perfect glitzy, splashy movie that this story about a glamorous whirlwind love affair deserves [...] The film's take may diverge from the novel, but it's those differences that make the film so memorable."

The Idea of You became Amazon Prime Video's most popular film worldwide in 2024.
