= Ray Nicholson =

American actor (born 1992)

- Nicholson in 2026
- Born: February 20, 1992 (age 34); Los Angeles, California, U.S.
- Occupation: Actor
- Years active: 2006–present
- Parents: Jack Nicholson (father); Rebecca Broussard (mother)
- Relatives: Lorraine Nicholson (sister)

Raymond Nicholson (born February 20, 1992) is an American actor. The son of actor Jack Nicholson and actress Rebecca Broussard, he gained wide recognition for starring in the horror film Smile 2 (2024).

== Early life ==
Nicholson is the son of Jack Nicholson and Rebecca Broussard. He attended the University of Southern California’s School of Cinematic Arts.

== Career ==
His first role was in the 2006 film The Benchwarmers. He then had minor roles in the multi-genre film Promising Young Woman (2020) and the romantic drama Licorice Pizza (2021). He then had starring roles in the Amazon Prime Video teen drama series Panic (2021) and Neil LaBute's thriller film Out of the Blue (2022). Nicholson had his breakthrough after being cast by Parker Finn in Smile 2 as an homage to Jack Torrance, the character his father Jack played in The Shining (1980). The film was released in 2024 to critical and commercial success.

== Filmography ==
=== Film ===
Key
†	Denotes films that have not yet been released

Year	Title	Role	Notes
2006	The Benchwarmers	Kid Catcher #1 Game #2	
2018	The Outsider	American Stock Broker	
2019	Where Are You	Cedric	
2020	Promising Young Woman	Jim	
2021	Licorice Pizza	Ray	
2022	Out of the Blue	Connor Bates	
2022	Something from Tiffany's	Gary Wilson	
2023	Gonzo Girl	Larry	
2024	I Love You Forever	Finn	
2024	Smile 2	Paul Hudson	
2025	Borderline	Paul Duerson	
2025	Novocaine	Simon Greenly	
2026	The Mosquito Bowl	Tony Butkovich	

=== Television ===
Year	Title	Role	Notes
2021	Panic	Ray Hall	10 episodes
2025	Adults	Ethan	Episode: "Have You Seen This Man?"
2026	The Beauty	Tig 2	Episodes: "Beautiful Brothers" and "Beautiful Betrayal"
