= Tom Francis (actor) =

British actor and singer (born 1999)

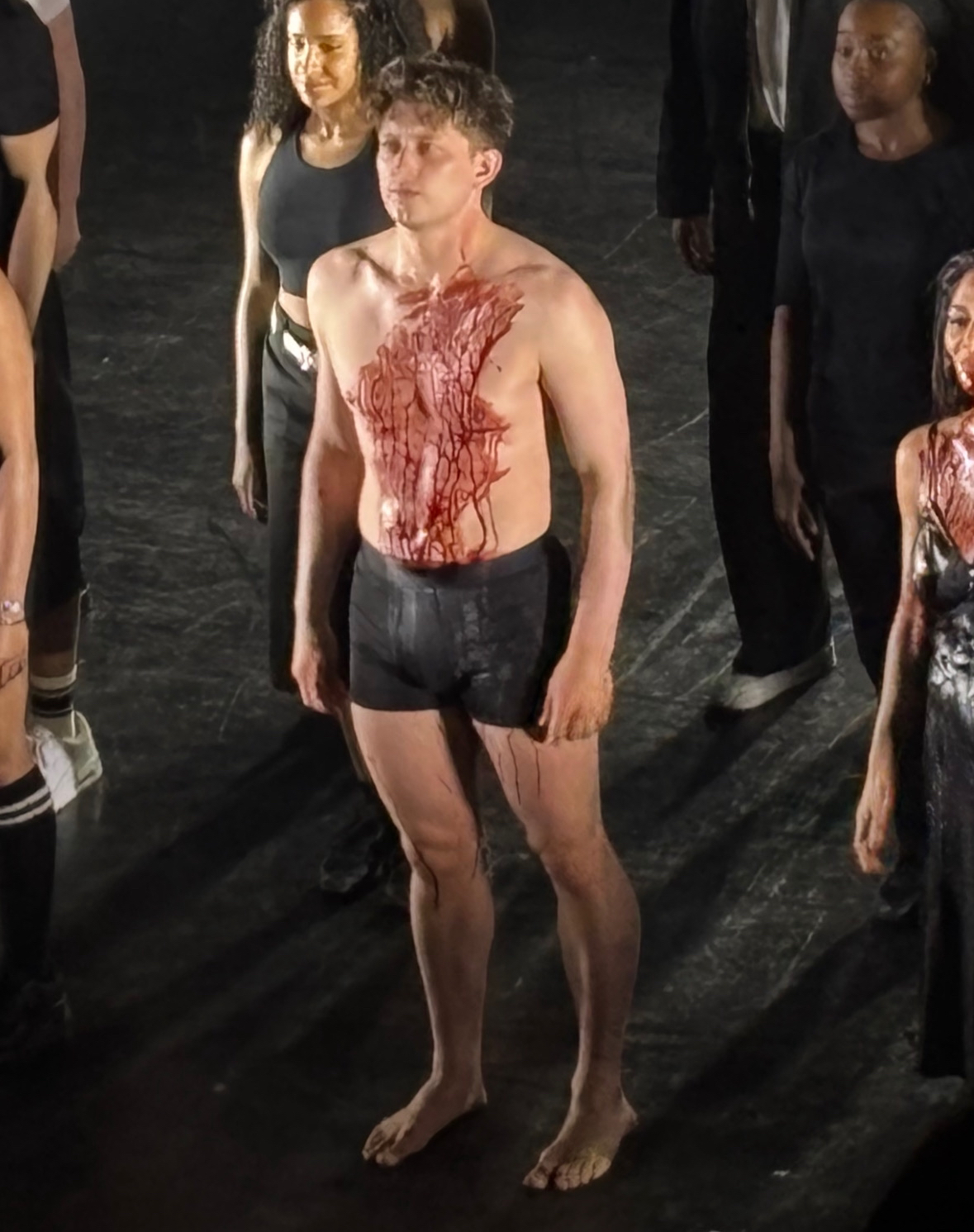
- Francis performing in the St. James Theatre in February 2025
- Born: Thomas Francis Barber; 29 June 1999 (age 27); Colchester, England
- Other name: Tom Barber
- Education: ArtsEd (BA)
- Occupations: Actor and singer
- Years active: 2020–present

Thomas Francis Barber (born 29 June 1999), known professionally as Tom Francis, is an English actor and singer known for his roles on the West End and Broadway stages. For his performance as Joe Gillis in Sunset Boulevard, he won the Laurence Olivier Award for Best Actor in a Musical and was nominated for the Tony Award for Best Actor in a Musical.

== Early life ==
Francis was born in Colchester and grew up in Thorpe Morieux, Suffolk. He joined the Youth Theatre at the Theatre Royal, Bury St Edmunds, he was part of the local Voice Squad group in Bury St Edmunds, and studied at the Arts Educational School (ArtsEd) in West London from 2017 to 2020, graduating with a Bachelor of Arts in Musical Theatre.

== Career ==
In 2020, Francis made his professional stage debut as Roger Davis in Rent at the Hope Mill Theatre in Manchester under the direction of Luke Sheppard. Francis would reunite with Sheppard for his following show & Juliet at London's Shaftesbury Theatre, taking over the role of Romeo in March 2022 and marking his West End debut.

In 2021, Francis performed as Claude in concert performances of Hair at the London Palladium, replacing Jordan Luke Gage.

For his performance as Joe Gillis in Sunset Boulevard at the Savoy Theatre, he won the 2024 Laurence Olivier Award for Best Actor in a Musical. Francis also performed at the awards show. He made his Broadway debut that fall when Sunset Boulevard transferred to the St. James Theatre. In both the Broadway and West End version, there is a six-minute sequence at the start of the second act in which Francis, performing as Joe, would exit the theatre to sing "Sunset Boulevard" while walking through Shubert Alley (in the West End, outside the Savoy Theatre), before returning to the theatre for the end of the song. In November, he took a pause from the role due to a vocal cord injury. He later received multiple nominations for his performance on Broadway, including for a Tony Award. Francis departed the role of Joe Gillis on July 6, with ensemble member Pierre Marais replacing him for the remaining two weeks of the production.

Francis made his television debut as Clayton in the fifth and final season of the Netflix series You. He made his film debut in Noah Baumbach's ensemble film Jay Kelly.

In 2026, he auditioned to play James Bond in the franchise's upcoming 26th film.

== Acting credits ==
=== Theatre ===
Year	Title	Role	Venue
2020	Rent	Roger Davis	Hope Mill Theatre, Manchester
2021	Hair	Claude Hooper Bukowski	London Palladium, West End
2021	What's New Pussycat?	Ensemble u/s Tom Jones	Birmingham Repertory Theatre
2022–23	& Juliet	Romeo Montague	Shaftesbury Theatre, West End
2023–24	Sunset Boulevard	Joe Gillis	Savoy Theatre, West End
2024–25	Sunset Boulevard	Joe Gillis	St. James Theater, Broadway

=== Film ===
Year	Title	Role	Notes
2025	Jay Kelly	Judd	
2026	The Mosquito Bowl	Dave Schreiner	

=== Television ===
Year	Title	Role	Notes
2025	You	Clayton	4 episodes
