= Peter Berg =

American actor and director (born 1964)

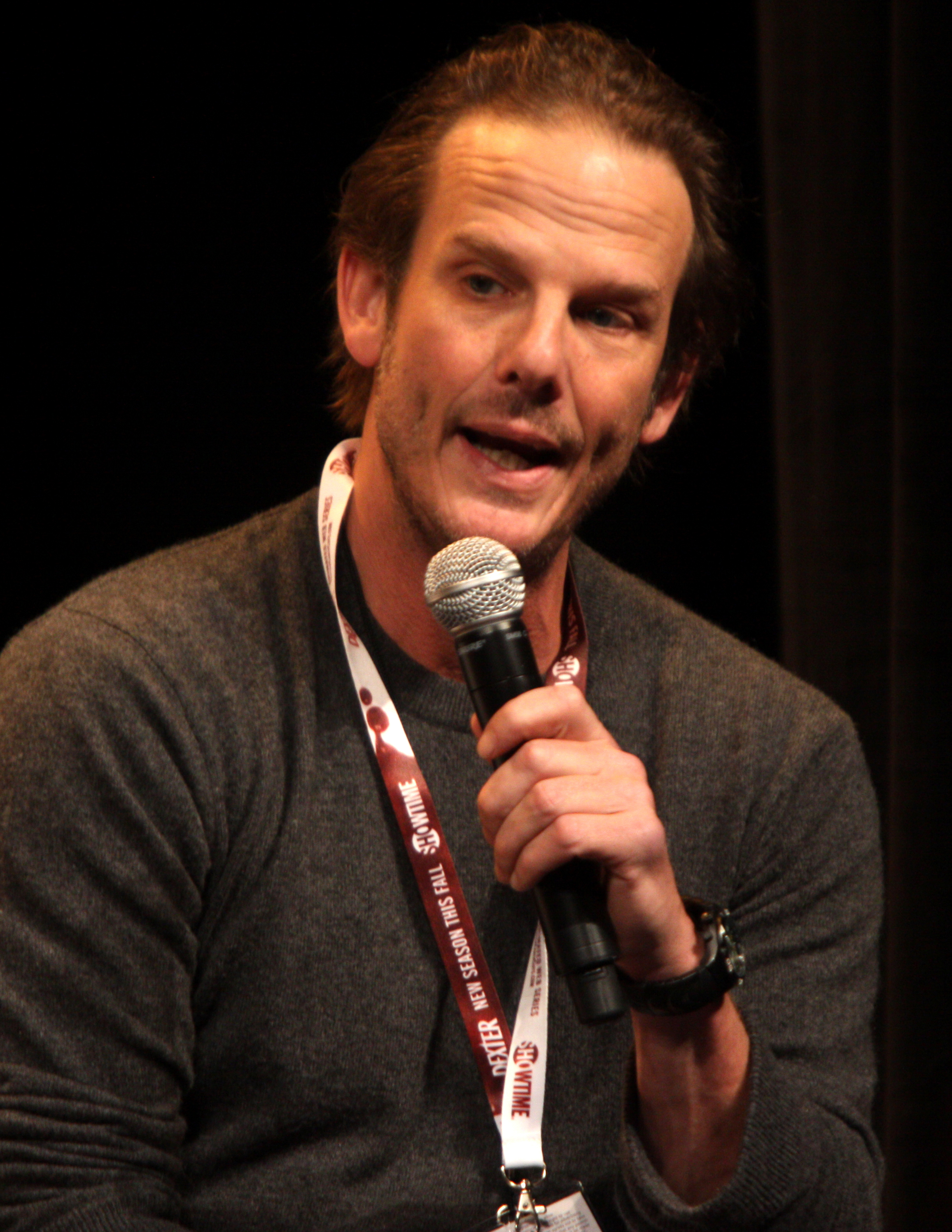
- Berg in 2012
- Born: March 11, 1964 (age 62); New York City, U.S.
- Education: The Taft School; Macalester College
- Occupations: Director; producer; writer; actor
- Years active: 1988–present
- Notable work: Friday Night Lights, Hancock, Battleship, Lone Survivor, Deepwater Horizon, Patriots Day
- Spouse: Elizabeth Rogers (m. 1993; div. 1998)
- Children: 1

Peter Berg (born March 11, 1964) is an American film and television director, producer, writer, and actor. Films he has directed include the black comedy Very Bad Things (1998), the action comedy The Rundown (2003), the sports drama films Friday Night Lights (2004) and The Mosquito Bowl (2026), the action thriller The Kingdom (2007), the superhero comedy-drama Hancock (2008), and the military science fiction war film Battleship (2012).

These were followed by five films starring his friend Mark Wahlberg: the war film Lone Survivor (2013), the disaster drama Deepwater Horizon (2016), the Boston Marathon bombing drama Patriots Day (2016), the action thriller Mile 22 (2018), and the action comedy Spenser Confidential (2020).

Berg created the ABC series Wonderland (2000), and developed the NBC series Friday Night Lights (2006–11), adapted from the film, earning two Primetime Emmy Award nominations.

As an actor, he’s best known for his role as Dr. Billy Kronk on the CBS medical drama Chicago Hope (1995–99).

== Early life ==
Berg was born on March 11, 1964 in New York City, the son of Laurence "Larry" Berg, a US Marine, and Sally (née Winkler) Berg. Berg's father was Jewish, as was his maternal grandfather. His mother was Christian.

Through his mother, Berg is a second cousin of writer H. G. Bissinger, whose book Friday Night Lights provided the basis for Berg's film and TV series of the same name. His mother co-founded a nonprofit directory of youth-focused charities named Catalog for Giving, and worked at a psychiatric hospital when Berg was growing up. He has a younger sister, Mary.

Peter was a student in the Chappaqua School System. After graduating from The Taft School in 1980, Berg attended Macalester College in Saint Paul, Minnesota, where he majored in theater arts and theater history and graduated in 1984. Berg later moved to Los Angeles to pursue his film career.

== Career ==
In his early days in Los Angeles, Berg worked such jobs as a prop assistant and a driver. Berg acted in 21 Jump Street and later in Never on Tuesday, Miracle Mile, Race For Glory, Shocker, Heart of Dixie, Tale of Two Sisters and Going Overboard in 1989. He acted in Genuine Risk in 1990 and in Late for Dinner and Crooked Hearts in 1991. In the early 1990s, he appeared in Fire in the Sky, Aspen Extreme, Across the Moon and F.T.W..

In 1992, Berg played a World War II soldier in the film A Midnight Clear. In 1996, Berg performed in The 24th Day, with Noah Wyle, at the Coronet Theater in Los Angeles. In 1998, Berg made his feature directorial debut with Very Bad Things, a black comedy starring Jon Favreau, Christian Slater, Jeremy Piven, Daniel Stern, and Leland Orser. The film, which was shown at the Toronto and San Sebastian Film Festivals, received mixed reviews.

In 2000, he created ABC’s Wonderland, dramatic television series set in a psychiatric emergency room. The show failed to deliver ratings and was canceled after the second episode had aired.

In 2003, Berg directed the action comedy The Rundown. Starring Dwayne Johnson and Seann William Scott, the film received mixed reviews from critics and disappointed at the box office, only grossing $80 million of its reported $85 million budget.

In 2004, Berg directed Friday Night Lights, a football film based on The New York Times bestseller written by Buzz Bissinger.

In 2006, Berg was an executive producer of NBC's Peabody and Emmy Award-winning drama Friday Night Lights, which takes inspiration from the book and Berg's film of the same name, but features an original storyline and new characters.

Berg appeared alongside Tom Cruise in the Robert Redford directed war film Lions for Lambs (2007) as Lt. Colonel Falco. Berg followed up in 2007 with directing The Kingdom, a Michael Mann-produced action-political thriller set in Saudi Arabia, starring Jamie Foxx and Chris Cooper, also with Jennifer Garner whom Berg met when he appeared on the television series Alias.

Berg directed the 2008 film Hancock, starring Will Smith, Charlize Theron and Jason Bateman, that grossed over $600,000,000 million worldwide.

Berg directed a Hulu commercial featuring Alec Baldwin, which both The New York Times and Time named best spot of Super Bowl XLIII. In 2009, Berg directed a two-hour pilot movie for the Fox television series Virtuality. Even though the show was not picked up for a full season, the pilot was released on DVD exclusively through Best Buy. Berg also directed the ESPN documentary 30 for 30: Kings Ransom in 2009. Berg also co-wrote the film The Losers (2010).

Berg also directed the science-fiction action film Battleship (2012), a live-action adaptation of the board game which became one of the biggest flops of all time, and the war film Lone Survivor (2013), an adaptation of Marcus Lutrell's book of the same name. Variety writer Justin Chang said Berg delivered "his most serious-minded work to date with Lone Survivor." The following year, Berg acted as producer on the 2014 film Hercules, which he was originally slated to direct before being replaced by Brett Ratner.

In 2013, Berg created the opening animation sequence for ESPN's Monday Night Football, the 80-second graphic featured Darth Vader, Pac-Man, President Ronald Reagan and football highlights of 44 years.

In 2014, he directed the first two episodes of HBO's The Leftovers.

In 2015, Berg launched the nonfiction studio Film 45 to complement his fiction studio Film 44.

In 2016, Berg directed the film Deepwater Horizon, based on the Deepwater Horizon explosion. Berg replaced director J. C. Chandor, who had exited the film due to creative differences. That same year, he directed CBS Films' Patriots Day, about the Boston Marathon bombing, and the following year directed the action thriller Mile 22. All three films starred Mark Wahlberg.

In 2017, Berg directed a Hyundai commercial which was recorded after the kickoff of Super Bowl LI and aired right after the game. His Film 44 company was recently signed to a first look deal with Netflix, which saw the release of his most recent film Spenser Confidential, the director's fifth collaboration with Wahlberg.

In 2019, Berg directed a commercial for the National Football League, "...football fans witnessed another milestone moment with the premiere of the NFL's Super Bowl commercial entitled The 100-Year Game. The two minute ad, which kicked off the celebration of the NFL's 100th season garnered the No. 1 spot in USA Today's Ad Meter with the publication describing it as "a tour de force starring an assemblage of many of the greats of NFL history."

In 2024, Berg announced he was working on a film based on the book The Mosquito Bowl: A Game of Life and Death in World War II. The Mosquito Bowl is set to release on Netflix in 2026.

In October 2025, Paramount Pictures announced that Berg had been attached to direct a live-action adaptation of Call of Duty (2028).

== Personal life ==
In 1993, Berg was married to Elizabeth Rogers; they have one child and divorced in 1998.

In July 2015, Berg criticized ESPN's decision to honor Caitlyn Jenner with the Arthur Ashe Courage Award by sharing his opinion on Instagram, where he posted a Facebook photo of Army veteran and double amputee Gregory D. Gadson alongside one of Jenner. The meme's caption said:

One man traded 2 legs for the freedom of the other to trade 2 balls for 2 boobs. Guess which man made the cover of Vanity Fair, was praised for his courage by President Obama, and is to be honored with the 'Arthur Ashe Courage Award' by ESPN?

After being criticized for the meme, Berg later said:

I have the utmost respect for Caitlyn Jenner and I am a strong supporter of equality and the rights of trans people everywhere. I also believe that we don’t give enough attention to our courageous returning war veterans, many of whom have sacrificed their bodies and mental health for our country and our principals [sic]--principals [sic] that include the freedom to live the life you want to live without persecution or abuse.

== Filmography ==
=== Film ===
Year	Title	Director	Writer	Producer	Notes
1998	Very Bad Things	Yes	Yes	No	Also composer ("Walls Come Down")
2003	The Rundown	Yes	No	No	
2004	Friday Night Lights	Yes	Yes	No	
2007	The Kingdom	Yes	No	No	
2008	Hancock	Yes	No	No	
2010	The Losers	No	Yes	No	
2012	Battleship	Yes	No	Yes	
2013	Lone Survivor	Yes	Yes	Yes	
2016	Deepwater Horizon	Yes	No	No	
2016	Patriots Day	Yes	Yes	No	
2018	Mile 22	Yes	No	Yes	
2020	Spenser Confidential	Yes	No	Yes	
2026	The Mosquito Bowl	Yes	Yes	Yes	

Executive producer

- Pu-239 (2006)
- Lars and the Real Girl (2007)
- Hercules (2014)

Producer only

- Hell or High Water (2016)
- Wind River (2017)
- The Beast (2026)

Acting roles

Year	Title	Role	Notes
1988	Quiet Victory: The Charlie Wedemeyer Story	Bobby	
1989	Never on Tuesday	Eddie	
1989	Miracle Mile	Band Member	
1989	Race for Glory	Chris Washburn	
1989	Shocker	Jonathan Parker	
1989	Heart of Dixie	Jenks	
1989	Tale of Two Sisters	Gardner	
1989	Going Overboard	Mort Ginsberg	as Pete Berg
1990	Genuine Risk	Henry	
1990	Forradalom után		
1991	Late for Dinner	Frank Lovegren	
1991	Crooked Hearts	Tom	
1992	A Midnight Clear	Bud Miller	
1993	A Case for Murder	Jack Hemmet	
1993	Fire in the Sky	David Whitlock	
1993	Aspen Extreme	Dexter Rutecki	
1994	Across the Moon	Lyle	
1994	Uneviled	Drug dealer	
1994	F.T.W.	Clem Stuart	
1994	The Last Seduction	Mike Swale	
1994	Rise and Walk: The Dennis Byrd Story	Dennis Byrd	
1995	Heavyweights	Chef (uncredited)	
1996	The Great White Hype	Terry Conklin	
1996	Girl 6	Caller No 1—Bob	
1997	Cop Land	Joey Randone	
1998	Very Bad Things	Doctor	
1999	Dill Scallion	Nate Clumson	
2001	Corky Romano	Paulie Romano	
2004	Collateral	Richard Weidner	
2006	Smokin' Aces	"Pistol" Pete Deeks	
2007	Lions for Lambs	Lt. Col. Falco	
2007	The Kingdom	FBI Agent	
2008	Hancock	Doctor	Uncredited
2012	Battleship	Sonar Mate	Uncredited
2013	Lone Survivor	Navy Personnel	Uncredited
2016	Deepwater Horizon	Mr. Skip	as Pete Berg
2016	Patriots Day	Guy opening MIT Door	as Pete Berg
2018	Mile 22	Lucas	as Pete Berg

Documentary appearances

- POM Wonderful Presents:
  The Greatest Movie Ever Sold (2011)
- Trophy Kids (2015)

=== Television ===
Year	Title	Director	Executive producer	Writer	Notes
1994–1997	Chicago Hope	Yes	No	Yes	Episodes "Colonel of Truth" and "Quiet Riot" (as Peter W. Berg)
2000	Wonderland	Yes	Yes	Yes	Creator, Episode "Pilot"
2006–2011	Friday Night Lights	Yes	Yes	Yes	Creator, Episodes "Pilot" and "East of Dillon"
2009	30 for 30	Yes	No	No	Episode "Kings Ransom", Also producer
2009	Virtuality	Yes	Yes	No	TV movie
2009–2010	Trauma	No	Yes	No	
2011–2012	Prime Suspect	Yes	Yes	No	Episode "Pilot"
2014–2017	The Leftovers	Yes	Yes	No	Episodes "Pilot" and "Penguin One, Us Zero"
2015–2019	Ballers	Yes	Yes	No	Episode "Pilot"
2019–2020	Dare Me	No	Yes	No	
2023	Painkiller	Yes	Yes	No	
2025	American Primeval	Yes	Yes	No	
TBA	The Green Beret's Guide to Surviving the Apocalypse	No	Yes	No	

Documentary works

Year	Title	Director	Executive producer	Notes
2018	The People's Fighters: Teofilo Stevenson and the Legend of Cuban Boxing	Yes	No	Documentary film, also narrator
2021	McCartney 3,2,1	No	Yes	
2022	Victoria's Secret: Angels and Demons	No	Yes	3 episodes
2024	God Save Texas	No	Yes	

Acting roles

Year	Title	Role	Notes
1988	21 Jump Street	Jerome Sawyer	Episode "Champagne High"
1995	Fallen Angels	Augie / Joe Wales	2 episodes
1995–1999	Chicago Hope	Dr. Billy Kronk	106 episodes
1996	The Naked Truth		1 episode
2002	The King of Queens	Lil' Eddie	Episode "Kirbed Enthusiasm"
2002	Alias	Agent Noah Hicks	Episodes "Snowman" and "Masquerade"
2008	Friday Night Lights	Morris "Mo" McArnold	Episode "May The Best Man Win"
2008–2010	Entourage	Himself	Season 5 and Season 7
2011	Prime Suspect	Deputy Chief Daniel Costello	2 episodes
2012	Californication	Himself	Episode "The Way of the Fist"
2014	The Leftovers	Pete	2 episodes
2015–2017	Ballers	Coach Berg	7 episodes
2017	Ryan Hansen Solves Crimes on Television	Himself	Episode "Eight Is the New Se7en"
2025	American Primeval	Fancher	1 episode
2025	The Studio	Himself	Episode "The Promotion"

=== Music video ===
Director

Year	Title	Artist
2003	"Addicted"	Enrique Iglesias
2008	"Keeps Gettin' Better"	Christina Aguilera
2012	"One More Night"	Maroon 5
2014	"Maps"	Maroon 5

Guest appearances

Year	Title	Artist(s)	Role	Ref.
1993	"Leaving Las Vegas"	Sheryl Crow	Driver	
2026	"Do Me Right"	Mr. Fantasy	Himself	

== Awards and nominations ==
Year	Award	Category	Film	Result
1996	Screen Actors Guild Award	Outstanding Performance by an Ensemble in a Drama Series	Chicago Hope	Nominated
1997	Screen Actors Guild Award	Outstanding Performance by an Ensemble in a Drama Series	Chicago Hope	Nominated
1998	Screen Actors Guild Award	Outstanding Performance by an Ensemble in a Drama Series	Chicago Hope	Nominated
1998	Deauville American Film Festival Award	Fun Radio Trophy	Very Bad Things	Won
1998	Deauville American Film Festival Award	Grand Special Prize	Very Bad Things	Nominated
1998	San Sebastián International Film Festival Award	Golden Seashell	Very Bad Things	Nominated
2005	AFI Award	Movie of the Year	Friday Night Lights	Won
2005	ESPY Award	Best Sports Movie	Friday Night Lights	Won
2005	Teen Choice Award	Choice Movie: Drama	Friday Night Lights	Nominated
2005	USC Scripter Award	Best Film (Shared with Buzz Bissinger and David Aaron Cohen)	Friday Night Lights	Nominated
2005	Young Artist Award	Best Family Feature Film – Drama	Friday Night Lights	Nominated
2007	Primetime Emmy Award	Outstanding Directing for a Drama Series	Friday Night Lights	Nominated
2007	Writers Guild of America	Best New Series (Shared with Bridget Carpenter, Kerry Ehrin, Carter Harris, Liz Heldens, David Hudgins, Jason Katims, Patrick Massett, Andy Miller, John Zinman)	Friday Night Lights	Nominated
2008	Golden Eagle Award	Best Foreign Film	Hancock	Nominated
2011	Primetime Emmy Award	Outstanding Drama Series	Friday Night Lights	Nominated
2013	Golden Raspberry Award	Worst Director	Battleship	Nominated
2013	Golden Raspberry Award	Worst Picture	Battleship	Nominated
2013	Golden Trailer Award	Best Summer Blockbuster 2012 TV Spot	Battleship	Nominated
2013	Houston Film Critics Society Award	Worst Film	Battleship	Nominated
2013	Satellite Award	Best Adapted Screenplay	Lone Survivor	Nominated
2014	Writers Guild of America Award	Best Adapted Screenplay	Lone Survivor	Nominated
2014	Saturn Award	Best Director	Lone Survivor	Nominated

== See also ==
- Directors with two films rated "A+" by CinemaScore
