= Buzz Bissinger =

American journalist and author

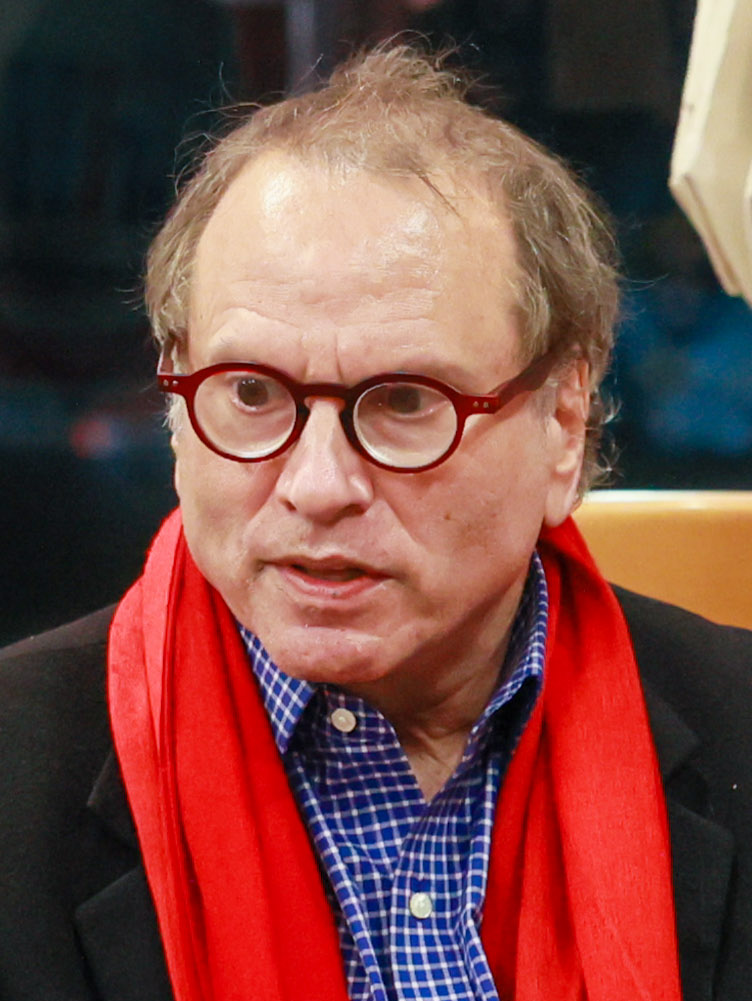
- Bissinger in 2023
- Born: Harry Gerard Bissinger III; November 1, 1954 (age 72); New York City, United States
- Occupation: Journalist

Harry Gerard "Buzz" Bissinger III (born November 1, 1954) is an American journalist and author, best known for his 1990 non-fiction book Friday Night Lights. He is a longtime contributing editor at Vanity Fair magazine. In 2019, HBO released a documentary on Bissinger titled Buzz.

== Early life and education ==
Born in New York, Bissinger is the son of Eleanor (née Lebenthal) and Harry Gerard Bissinger II. His father was a former president of the municipal bond firm Lebenthal & Company. He graduated from Phillips Academy in 1972 and from the University of Pennsylvania in 1976, where he was a sports and opinion editor for The Daily Pennsylvanian. He is the cousin of Peter Berg, who directed the film adaptation of Bissinger's book Friday Night Lights.

== Journalism ==
In 1987, while writing for The Philadelphia Inquirer, Bissinger won the Pulitzer Prize for Investigative Reporting for his story on corruption in the Philadelphia court system.

In 1998 his article "Shattered Glass", an exposé of the career of New Republic writer Stephen Glass, was published in the magazine Vanity Fair, where he is a contributing editor. The article was adapted for the 2003 film of the same name.

Bissinger's July 2015 Vanity Fair cover story "Call Me Caitlyn", on the transition of former Olympic decathlete, businessperson, and television personality Bruce Jenner to Caitlyn Jenner, star of E!'s Keeping Up with the Kardashians and I Am Cait, with photographs by Annie Leibovitz, was one of the biggest international scoops in years. Bissinger had exclusive access to Jenner both immediately before and after her cosmetic surgery. The 11,000-word article was months in the making and was kept heavily under wraps until it was released on the magazine's website on June 1.

Bissinger's article for Vanity Fair, "Gone with the Wind" (August 2007), about the saga of 2006 Kentucky Derby Winner Barbaro, has been optioned by Universal Pictures. His magazine work has also appeared in The New York Times and Sports Illustrated.

In 2008, Bissinger wrote "The Throwback", an online sports column for The New York Times.

Bissinger also served as a columnist at The Daily Beast. On October 8, 2012, Bissinger endorsed Mitt Romney for president. Bissinger wrote a piece in August 2020 saying that he and his wife would move to Italy if Donald Trump were re-elected President of the United States.

He briefly hosted a daily radio talk show on WPHT Philadelphia 1210 with Steve Martorano.

== Books ==
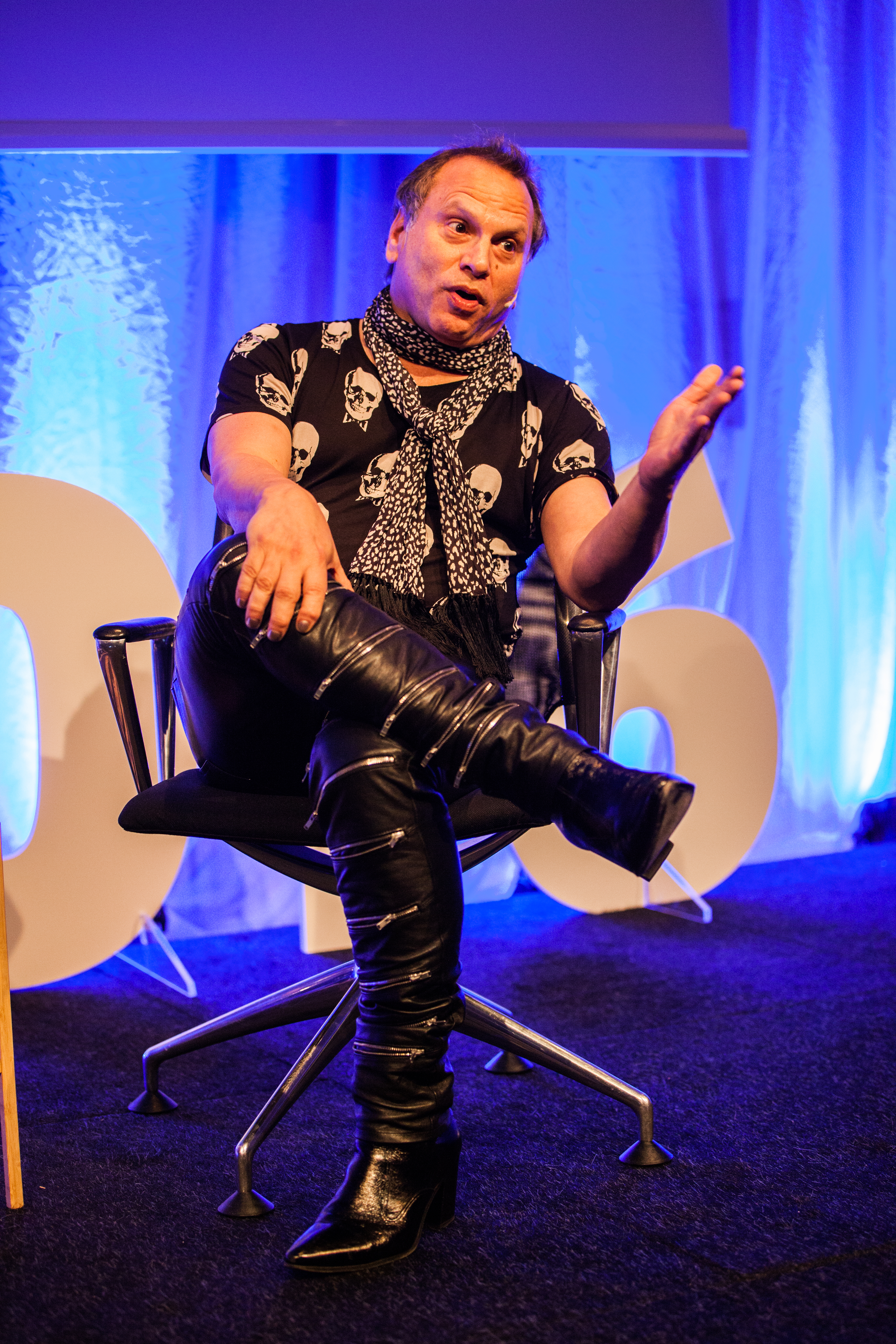
Bissinger in 2016

Bissinger is perhaps best known for his book Friday Night Lights: A Town, a Team, and a Dream, which documents the 1988 season of the football team of Permian High School in Odessa, Texas. This work was the inspiration for the 1993 television series Against the Grain, and was turned into a successful film (which was released in October 2004), and a television series which debuted on NBC on October 3, 2006. The book has sold nearly two million copies. In a list of the one hundred best books on sports ever, Sports Illustrated ranked Friday Night Lights fourth and the best ever on football. ESPN called Friday Night Lights the best book on sports over the past quarter-century.

A Prayer for the City, published in 1998, offers insight into the urban political scene of Philadelphia during Mayor (who later became the Governor of Pennsylvania until 2011) Ed Rendell's term in the 1990s.

The New York Times' bestselling Three Nights in August, published in 2005, chronicles a series in August 2003 between the St. Louis Cardinals and the Chicago Cubs through the perspective of Cardinals manager Tony La Russa.

Shooting Stars was published by Penguin Press in September 2009. The book, co-authored with basketball superstar LeBron James, tells the story of James' high school career where he and his four best friends won a championship in basketball. As part of the promotion of Shooting Stars, Bissinger appeared as a "Guest Commenter" on a Deadspin post on October 1, 2009.

In April 2012, Bissinger released After Friday Night Lights, a sequel to Friday Night Lights which focuses on Bissinger's relationship with James "Boobie" Miles, a major character in his first book.

Father's Day, published in May 2012 by Houghton Mifflin Harcourt, is a memoir that revolves around a singular cross-country road trip taken with one of his twin sons, Zach, an autistic savant.

In 2022 Bissinger wrote The Mosquito Bowl: A Game of Life and Death in World War II, which was widely reviewed.

== Awards and honors ==
In 2013, Bissinger was awarded an honorary degree by Drexel University in recognition of his exceptional contributions as one of the "nation's most honored and distinguished writers". He has received numerous other awards for his writing.

== Personal life ==
Bissinger has been married three times. He has questioned his own sexuality as well as his gender identity.

He is addicted to both shopping and sex, and has been to therapy for both. In a column published in GQ, Bissinger states he is a shopaholic with an obsession for expensive designer clothes, spending $638,412.97 between 2010 and 2012.

He is married to Lisa C. Smith, a former Assistant Vice Chancellor of NYU Abu Dhabi. He has three sons. A resident of Washington state, he divides his time between homes in Philadelphia and the Pacific Northwest.
